= Municipal elections in Barcelona =

Spanish local city elections

Municipal elections in Barcelona are held every four years to elect the city council. The mayor is elected indirectly by the councillors on the first plenary session of the term.

== Overview ==
The basic level of Spanish local government are the municipalities (Spanish: municipios, Catalan: municipis). The city of Barcelona constitutes a municipality. The reigning institution in Barcelona is called Ajuntament de Barcelona, and is formed by the mayor (Catalan: alcalde, fem. alcaldessa), the government (Catalan: Comissió de govern, although it is commonly known as Govern municipal) and the legislature or city council (Catalan: Consell Municipal, although it is commonly known as Ple de l'Ajuntament).

Local elections in Spain are regulated by the LOREG law. Municipal elections are held every 4 years on the last Sunday of May, in all the municipalities of Spain at the same time, together with other regional elections (though not in Catalonia) and other local-level elections, such as comarcal or provincial council elections. If European elections are scheduled to take place on the same dates, local elections must be held the same day with European Parliament elections.

The size of the legislature is determined by the population count on 1 January before the election. In Barcelona, the city council currently has 41 members. Voters elect only the members of the city council; the mayor is elected indirectly. Voting is non-compulsory. Local councillors are elected using the D'Hondt method and a closed-list proportional representation, with a threshold of 5 percent of valid votes, which include blank ballots.

The mayor is elected on the first plenary session of the term by the city councillors in a single-round election. If any candidate obtains an absolute majority of the votes, the candidate of the most voted party is elected as a mayor. After the plenary session, the Mayor chooses councillors to be in the government executive.

Since the restoration of democracy after the fascist dictatorship of Francisco Franco, elections have taken place on 3 April 1979, 8 May 1983, 10 June 1987, 26 May 1991, 28 May 1995, 13 June 1999, 25 May 2003, 27 May 2007, 22 May 2011, 24 May 2015, 26 May 2019 and 28 May 2023; the next scheduled election is on 23 May 2027.

== Results ==
=== 2015 election ===
← Summary of 24 May 2015 City Council of Barcelona election results →
Parties and coalitions	Popular vote			Seats	
Parties and coalitions	Votes	%	±pp	Total	+/−
Barcelona in Common (Let's Win Barcelona)–Agreement (BComú–Entesa)^{1}	176,612	25.21	+14.82	11	+6
Convergence and Union (CiU)	159,393	22.75	−5.98	10	−4
Citizens–Party of the Citizenry (C's)	77,272	11.03	+9.09	5	+5
Republican Left of Catalonia–Municipal Agreement (ERC–BcnCO–AM)	77,120	11.01	+5.42	5	+3
Socialists' Party of Catalonia–Progress Candidacy (PSC–CP)	67,489	9.63	−12.51	4	−7
People's Party (PP)	61,004	8.71	−8.53	3	−6
Popular Unity Candidacy–Let's Reverse Barcelona (CUP–Capgirem)	51,945	7.42	+5.47	3	+3

Parties with less than 1.0% of the vote	23,298	3.33	—	0	±0
Animalist Party Against Mistreatment of Animals (PACMA)	5,720	0.82	+0.11	0	±0
The Greens–The Ecologist Alternative (EV–AE)	5,684	0.81	New	0	±0
Better Barcelona (RI.cat–SI)^{2}	2,626	0.37	−0.76	0	±0
Blank Seats (EB)	1,957	0.28	−1.39	0	±0
Platform for Catalonia (PxC)	1,617	0.23	−0.34	0	±0
Vox–Family and Life Party (Vox–PFiV)	1,520	0.22	+0.13	0	±0
United Free Citizens (CILUS)	989	0.14	New	0	±0
Union, Progress and Democracy (UPyD)	811	0.12	−0.12	0	±0
Communist Party of the Catalan People (PCPC)	656	0.09	−0.07	0	±0
Spanish Phalanx of the CNSO (FE–JONS)	455	0.07	+0.01	0	±0
Humanist Party (PH)	439	0.06	−0.04	0	±0
United for Declaring Catalan Independence (UPDIC)	286	0.04	New	0	±0
Libertarian Party (P–LIB)	273	0.04	New	0	±0
Internationalist Solidarity and Self-Management (SAIn)	166	0.02	−0.02	0	±0
The National Coalition (LCN)	99	0.01	New	0	±0

Blank ballots	6,363	0.91	−3.56		
Total	700,496			41	±0
Valid votes	700,496	99.56	+1.26		
Invalid votes	3,094	0.44	−1.26		
Votes cast / turnout	703,590	60.59	+7.60		
Abstentions	457,550	39.41	−7.60		
Registered voters	1,161,140				
Sources
Footnotes: ^{1} Barcelona in Common (Let's Win Barcelona)–Agreement results are compared to Initiative for Catalonia Greens–United and Alternative Left totals in the 2011 election.; ^{2} Better Barcelona results are compared to Catalan Solidarity for Independence totals in the 2011 election.

=== Historical composition of the City Council ===
==== 1901–1939 ====
Until Primo de Rivera's dictatorship, only one half of the council was renewed at every election. The numbers below indicate the total seats after the election.

Election	Left and Republicans				Nationalists		Monarchist				Other	Total
Election	PRR	PRDF UFNR	ERC	Other	LR LC	Other	PL	PLC	CT	Other	Other	Total
1901				13	17		8	9			3	50
1903				29	17		4					50
1905				31	19							50
1909 (May)	25	11			14							50
1909 (Dec)	29	13			8							50
1911	24	11			15				(LR)			50
1913	21	5		2	18		1		2		1	50
1915	20	1		3	20		4		2			50
1917	23				22		3		2			50
1920	16				26	1	1		3	2	1	50
1922	14				28				4	3	1	50
1923–1931: Primo de Rivera dictatorship
1931	12		25	1	12							50
1934	4		26		10							40
1939–1979: Francisco Franco's Francoist Spain

==== After 1979 ====
Election	Left				Centre-right/Right					Total	Mayor after election	Party
Election	CUP	PSUC ICV BeC	ERC	PSC	Cs	CiU Junts	UCD	AP CP PP	Vox	Total	Mayor after election	Party
1979		9	2	16		8	8			43	Narcís Serra	PSC
1983		3	0	21		13		6		43	Pasqual Maragall	PSC
1987		2	0	21		17		3		43	Pasqual Maragall	PSC
1991		3	0	20		16		4		43	Pasqual Maragall	PSC
1995		3	2	16		13		7		41	Pasqual Maragall	PSC
1999		2	3	20		10		6		41	Joan Clos	PSC
2003		5	5	15		9		7		41	Joan Clos	PSC
2007		4	4	14	0	12		7		41	Jordi Hereu	PSC
2011	0	5	2	11	0	14		9		41	Xavier Trias	CiU
2015	3	11	5	4	5	10		3	0	41	Ada Colau	BeC
2019	0	10	10	8	6	5		2	0	41	Ada Colau	BeC
2023	0	9	5	10	0	11		4	2	41	Jaume Collboni	PSC
2027										43		

== See also ==
- List of mayors of Barcelona
- Politics of Catalonia
- Elections in Spain
