= City Council of Barcelona =

Municipal government of Barcelona

Barcelona City Council Ajuntament de Barcelona

History
- Founded: 1835

Leadership
- Mayor: Jaume Collboni, PSC since 17 June 2023

Structure
- Seats: 41
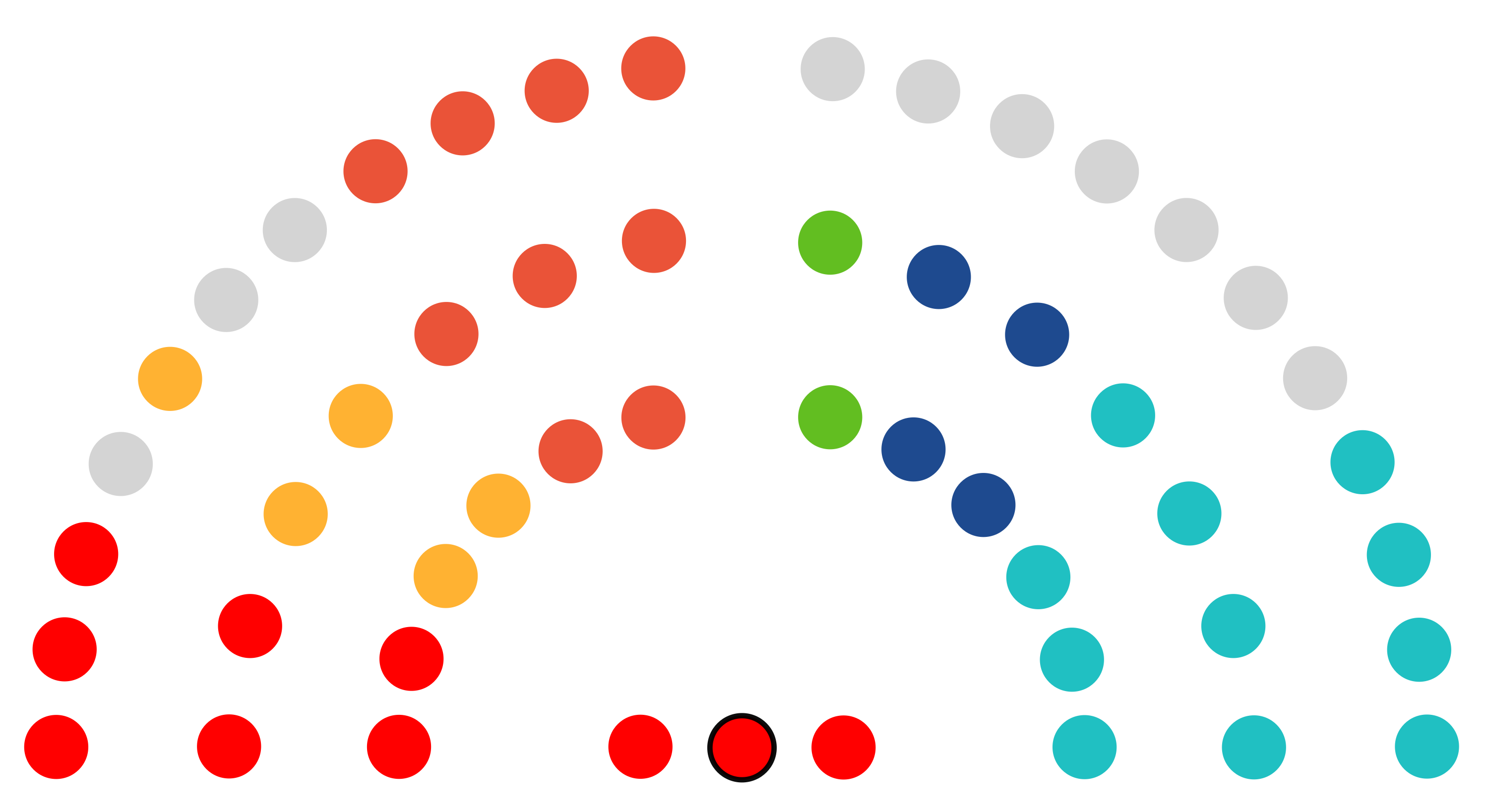
- Political groups: Government (10): PSC–PSOE (10); Opposition (31): Junts (11); BComú (9); ERC (5); PP (4); Vox (2)
- Length of term: 4 years

Elections
- Last election: May 28, 2023
- Next election: May 23, 2027

Meeting place
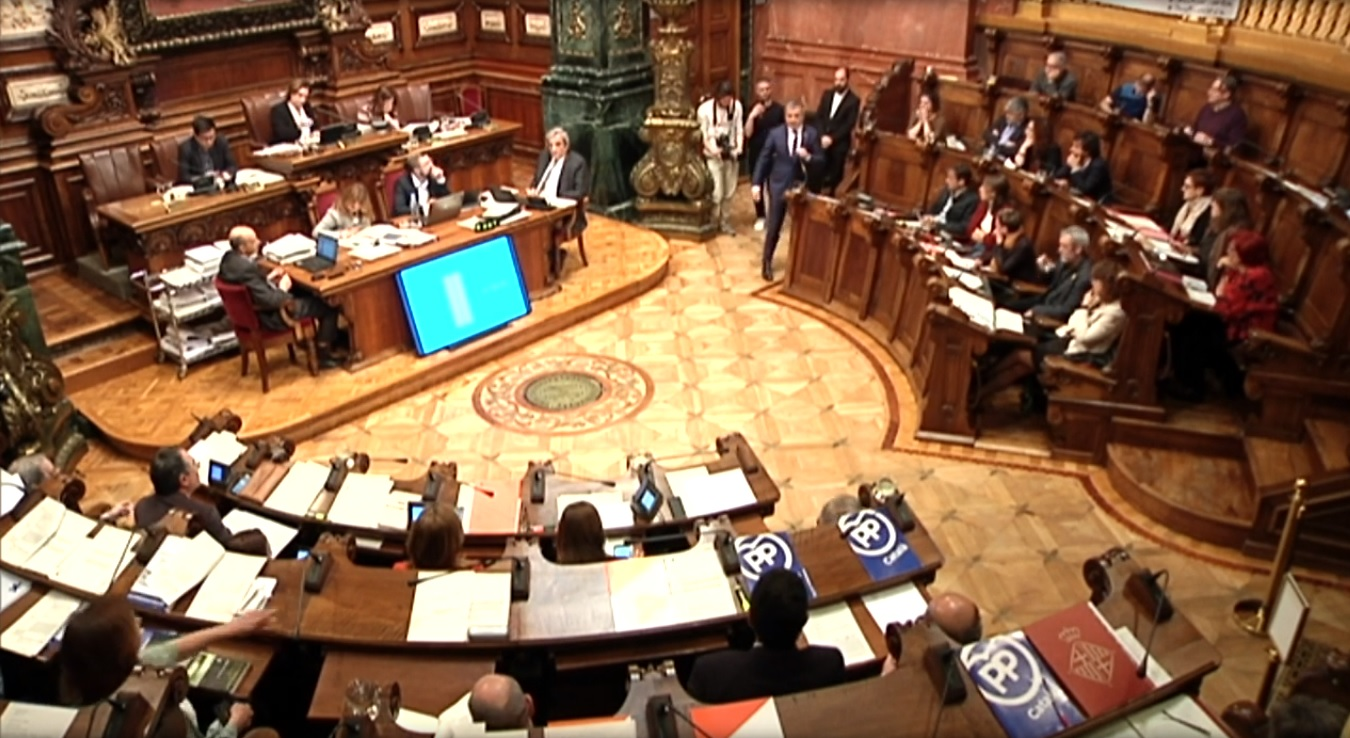
- Saló Carles Pi i Sunyer, Barcelona City Hall (Ordinary meetings)
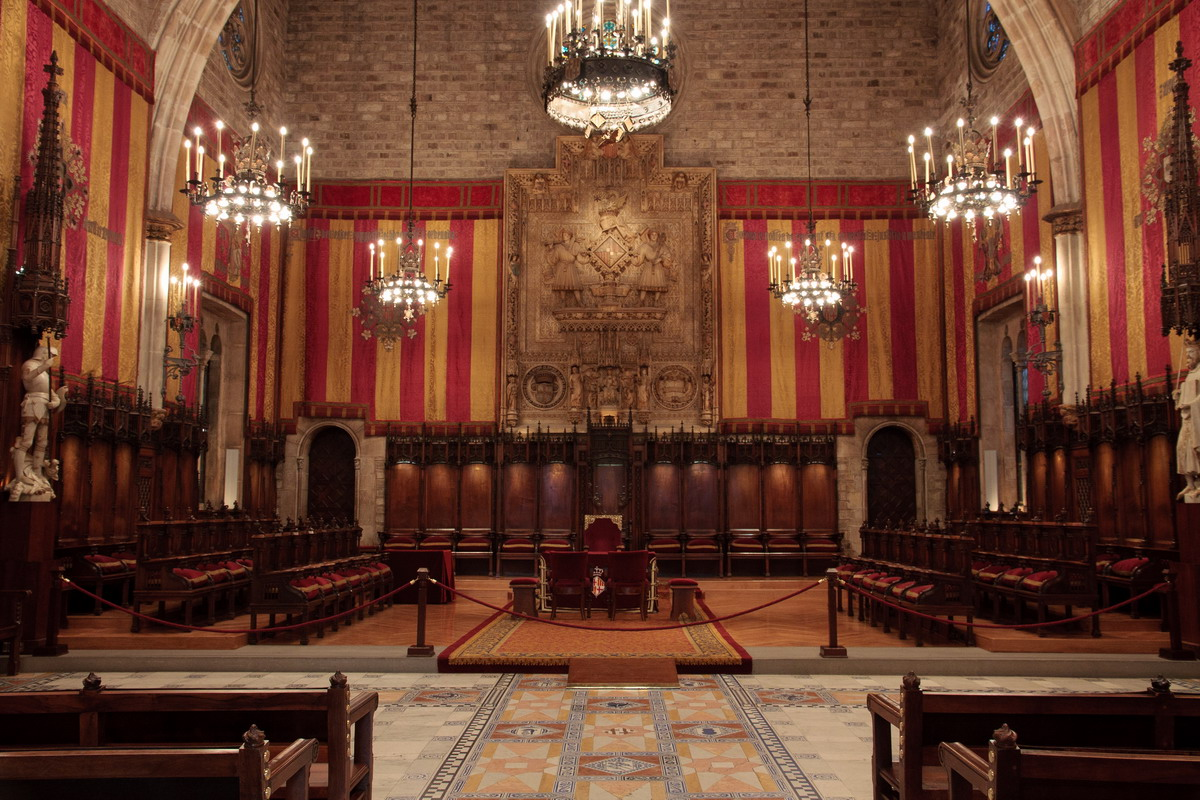
- Saló de Cent, Barcelona City Hall (Solemn meetings)

Website
- ajuntament.barcelona.cat

The City Council of Barcelona (Catalan: Ajuntament de Barcelona; Spanish: Ayuntamiento de Barcelona) is the top-tier administrative and governing body of the municipality of Barcelona, Catalonia, Spain. In terms of political structure, it consists of the invested Mayor of Barcelona, currently Jaume Collboni, the Government Commission, and an elected 41-member deliberative Plenary (Consell Municipal) with scrutiny powers.

== Mayor ==
The Mayor is elected by the members of the plenary among its members the day the new municipal corporation is formed after the local election. The officeholder has a mandate for the 4-year duration of the elected body. If the Mayor leaves office ahead of time a new voting may take place among the plenary members in order to invest a new mayor (meanwhile, another local councillor, conventionally the first deputy mayor, may act as acting Mayor). Since 17 June 2023 the Mayor is Jaume Collboni. The opening session in which the Mayor is invested is traditionally held at the Saló de Cent.

== Government Commission ==
The Government Commission (Comissió de Govern; also Junta de Govern or Junta de Gobierno) is formed by the Mayor, the Deputy Mayors, and a number of appointed councillors.

== Municipal Council ==
The municipal council (Consell Municipal) is the body formed by the elected councillors of the Ajuntament. The plenary meetings (Ple) are held at the "Carles Pi i Sunyer" Hall. It is formed by the municipal councillors, elected through closed party list proportional representation. 41 councillors are currently elected on the basis of the population of the municipality. Councillors are grouped in Municipal Groups on the basis of their political filiation. The Municipal Council can also meet in Commissions (akin to parliamentary committees).

A list of local elections (electing the councillors of the Plenary) since the restoration of the democratic system is presented as follows:

=== Results of the elections since 1901 ===
City councelors in the City Council of Barcelona since 1901
Key to parties PRR LR ACR USC Other left PSUC CUP IC ICV–EUiA BComú PSC ERC UCD Junts TriasxBCN CiU Cs BCN Canvi–Cs AP PP Vox
Election	Distribution	Mayor	Government Composition
1901	1 / 12 / 3 / 8 / 17 / 9	Directly appointed by the King	
1903	29 / 4 / 17	Directly appointed by the King	
1905	31 / 19	Directly appointed by the King	
May 1909	25 / 11 / 14	Directly appointed by the King	
Dec 1909	29 / 13 / 8	Directly appointed by the King	
1911	24 / 11 / 15	Directly appointed by the King	
1913	21 / 5 / 2 / 18 / 1 / 1 / 2	Directly appointed by the King	
1915	20 / 1 / 3 / 20 / 4 / 2	Directly appointed by the King	
1917	23 / 22 / 3 / 2	Directly appointed by the King	
1920	16 / 1 / 26 / 1 / 1 / 2 / 3	Directly appointed by the King	
1922	14 / 1 / 28 / 3 / 4	Directly appointed by the King	
1923–1931: Dictatorship of Primo de Rivera. During this interval, city councils were dissolved and no elections were held.		Directly appointed by the Civil Governor of Barcelona	
1931	12 / 1 / 25 / 12	Jaume Aiguader (ERC)	Aiguader; ERC
1934	3 / 17 / 2 / 4 / 4 / 10	Carles Pi i Sunyer (ERC) (1934)	Pi i Sunyer I ERC
1934	1934–1936: Suspension of autonomy. During this interval, the city council was replaced by a central government appointed management commission.	Directly appointed by the Governor General of Catalonia (1934–1936)	
1934	3 / 17 / 2 / 4 / 4 / 10	Carles Pi i Sunyer (ERC) (1936–1937)	Pi i Sunyer II; ERC
1934	3 / 17 / 2 / 4 / 4 / 10	Hilari Salvadó i Castell (ERC) (1937–1939)	Salvadó; ERC
1939–1979: Francoist dictatorship. During this interval, no elections were held.		Directly appointed by the Civil Governor of Barcelona	
1979	9 / 16 / 8 / 8	Narcís Serra (PSC) (1979–1982)	Serra; PSC–PSUC
1979	9 / 16 / 8 / 8	Pasqual Maragall (PSC) (1982–1997)	Maragall I PSC–PSUC
1983	3 / 21 / 13 / 6	Pasqual Maragall (PSC) (1982–1997)	Maragall II; PSC–PSUC
1987	2 / 21 / 17 / 3	Pasqual Maragall (PSC) (1982–1997)	Maragall III; PSC–ICV
1991	3 / 20 / 16 / 4	Pasqual Maragall (PSC) (1982–1997)	Maragall IV; PSC–ICV
1995	3 / 2 / 16 / 13 / 7	Pasqual Maragall (PSC) (1982–1997)	Maragall V PSC–ICV–ERC
1995	3 / 2 / 16 / 13 / 7	Joan Clos (PSC) (1997-2006)	Clos I PSC–ICV–ERC
1999	2 / 3 / 20 / 10 / 6	Joan Clos (PSC) (1997-2006)	Clos II; PSC–ERC–ICV
2003	5 / 5 / 15 / 9 / 7	Joan Clos (PSC) (1997-2006)	Clos III; PSC–ERC–ICV
2003	5 / 5 / 15 / 9 / 7	Jordi Hereu (PSC) (2006-2011)	Hereu I PSC–ERC–ICV
2007	4 / 4 / 14 / 12 / 7	Jordi Hereu (PSC) (2006-2011)	Hereu II; PSC–ICV
2011	5 / 2 / 11 / 14 / 9	Xavier Trias (CDC)	Trias; CiU
2015	3 / 11 / 5 / 4 / 10 / 5 / 3	Ada Colau (BComú)	Colau I BComú until May 2016; BComú–PSC between May 2016 and Nov 2017; BComú from Nov 2017
2019	10 / 10 / 8 / 5 / 6 / 2	Ada Colau (BComú)	Colau II; BComú–PSC until Jan 2023; BComú from Jan 2023
2023	9 / 5 / 10 / 11 / 4 / 2	Jaume Collboni (PSC)	Collboni; PSC

== Public bodies and companies ==
A part of the management is conducted by entities wholly or partially owned by the Ajuntament:

Autonomous bodies

- Institut Municipal de Persones amb Discapacitat
- Institut Municipal d'Informàtica de Barcelona
- Institut Municipal d'Hisenda
- Institut Municipal de Mercats de Barcelona
- Institut Municipal d'Educació de Barcelona
- Institut Municipal del Paisatge Urbà i la Qualitat de Vida
- Institut Municipal Barcelona Esports
- Institut Municipal de Serveis Socials de Barcelona

Public business entities

- Institut Municipal Fundació Mies van der Rohe
- Institut Municipal de l'Habitatge i Rehabilitació
- Institut Municipal de Parcs i Jardins
- Institut Municipal d'Urbanisme
- Institut de Cultura de Barcelona

Limited companies

- Barcelona Cicle de l'Aigua, SA - BCASA
- Informació i Comunicació de Barcelona, SA
- Barcelona Activa SAU SPM
- Barcelona de Serveis Municipals, SA - BSM
- Parc d'Atraccions Tibidabo, SA
- Tractament i Seleccions de Residus, SA - TERSA
- Selectives Metropolitanes, SA - SEMESA
- Solucions Integrals pels Residus, SA - SIRESA
- Cementiris de Barcelona, SA
- Mercabarna
- Barcelona d'Infraestructures Municipals, SA - BIMSA
- Foment de Ciutat, SA

Consortiums, foundations and associations

- Fundació Museu Picasso de Barcelona
- Fundació Barcelona Institute of Technology for the Habitat
- Associación Red Internacional de Ciudades Educadoras
- Institut Infància y Adolescència de Barcelona, C.
- Consorci Campus Interuniversitari Diagonal-Besòs
- Agència d'Ecologia Urbana de Barcelona
- Agència Local de l'Energia de Barcelona
- Consorci del Besòs
- Consorci de Biblioteques de Barcelona
- Consorci Mercat de les Flors
- Consorci Localret
- Consorcio Museu de Ciències Naturals de Barcelona
- Consorci Museu d'Art Contemporani de Barcelona
- Consorci de L'Auditori y la Orquestra
- Fundació Barcelona Cultura
- Fundació Navegació Oceànica de Barcelona
- Fundació Carles Pi i Sunyer d'Estudis Autonòmics i Locals
- Fundación Privada Julio Muñoz Ramonet
- Fundació Barcelona Mobile World Capital Foundation
- Red de Juderías de España, Caminos de Sefarad
- Agència de Salut Pública de Barcelona
- Consorci Institut d’Infància i Món Urbà
- Consorci Campus Interuniversitari del Besòs
- Agència d'Ecologia Urbana de Barcelona
- Agència Local de l'Energia de Barcelona
- Consorci del Besòs
- Consorci de Biblioteques de Barcelona
- Consorci del Mercat de les Flors/Centre de les Arts de Moviment
- Consorci El Far
- Consorci Local Localret

Foundations and associations

- Fundació Barcelona Cultura
- Fundació Navegación Oceánica de Barcelona
- Asociación Red Internacional de Ciudades Educadoras

== See also ==
- Local government in Spain
- Street furniture in Barcelona
- Street names in Barcelona
- Urban planning of Barcelona
