= 1911 Barcelona City Council election =

The 1911 Barcelona City Council election was held on Sunday, 12 November 1911, to elect half of the Barcelona City Council. 28 out of 50 seats were up for election (3 were vacant seats).

== Electoral system ==
The number of seats of each council was determined by the population count, according to the 1877 Municipal Law. As Barcelona had more than 200,000 inhabitants, the number of seats composing the city council was 50. The municipal law also established that half of the seats had to be renewed every two years. Therefore, in these elections 25 seats had to be renewed. Additionally, any vacant seat would also be renewed. The municipality was divided in 10 multi-member constituencies, corresponding to the city districts. Seats were elected using limited partial block voting. Candidates winning a plurality in each constituency were elected. In districts electing. Voting was on the basis of universal manhood suffrage, which comprised all national males over twenty-five, having at least a two-year residency in a municipality and in full enjoyment of their civil rights.

The Municipal Law allowed the King of Spain to elect directly the Mayor of Barcelona.

== Results ==
← Summary of the 12 November 1911 Barcelona City Council election results →
| Party | Vote | | | Seats | | |
| Party | Votes | % | ±pp | Won | Total | +/− |
|---|---|---|---|---|---|---|
| Barcelonian Candidacy (LR–CT–CDS) | 50,171 | 36.07 | +11.33 | 11 | 15 | +7 |
| Radical Republican Party (PRR) | 45,031 | 32.37 | −8.58 | 12 | 24 | −5 |
| Republican Nationalist Federal Union (UFNR) | 39,890 | 28.68 | −2.50 | 5 | 11 | −2 |
| Liberal Party (PL) | 2,732 | 1.96 | −0.65 | 0 | 0 | ±0 |
| Independent Republicans (Rep.i) | 1,273 | 0.92 | +0.41 | 0 | 0 | ±0 |
| Total | 139,097 | 100.00 | | 28 | 50 | − |

Vote share
| LR–CT–CDS | 36.07% |
| PRR | 32.37% |
| UFNR | 28.68% |
| PL | 1.96% |
| Rep.i | 0.92% |

City council seats up for election
| LR–CT–CDS | 39.29% |
| PRR | 42.86% |
| UFNR | 17.86% |

=== Results by district ===
| District | LR–CT–CDS | | PRR | | UFNR | | PL | | Rep.i | |
| District | % | S | % | S | % | S | % | S | % | S |
|---|---|---|---|---|---|---|---|---|---|---|
| I Barceloneta−El Poblenou | 18.7 | − | 56.2 | 2 | 25.1 | − | 0.0 | − | 0.0 | − |
| II La Ribera | 40.9 | 1 | 30.7 | 1 | 25.8 | − | 0.0 | − | 2.6 | − |
| III Barri Gòtic | 65.0 | 2 | 19.0 | − | 16.0 | 1 | 0.0 | − | 0.0 | − |
| IV Dreta de l'Eixample | 50.0 | 1 | 22.9 | − | 27.1 | 1 | 0.0 | − | 0.0 | − |
| V Raval | 30.2 | − | 38.7 | 2 | 31.1 | 1 | 0.0 | − | 0.0 | − |
| VI Esquerra de l'Eixample | 42.5 | 3 | 28.4 | − | 29.1 | 1 | 0.0 | − | 0.0 | − |
| VII Sants-Poble Sec | 19.3 | − | 39.7 | 3 | 32.4 | 1 | 8.7 | − | 0.0 | − |
| VIII Gràcia | 38.4 | 2 | 28.3 | − | 33.3 | 1 | 0.0 | − | 0.0 | − |
| IX Sant Andreu−Horta | 35.6 | 2 | 30.4 | 1 | 30.3 | − | 0.0 | − | 3.8 | − |
| X Sant Martí | 20.0 | − | 45.1 | 2 | 17.4 | − | 1.7 | − | 15.8 | − |
| Total | 36.1 | 11 | 32.4 | 11 | 28.7 | 6 | 2.0 | − | 0.9 | − |
