= 1913 Barcelona City Council election =

The 1913 Barcelona City Council election was held on Sunday, 9 November 1913, to elect half of the Barcelona City Council. 25 out of 50 seats were up for election.

== Electoral system ==
The number of seats of each council was determined by the population count, according to the 1877 Municipal Law. As Barcelona had more than 200,000 inhabitants, the number of seats composing the city council was 50. The municipal law also established that half of the seats had to be renewed every two years. Therefore, in these elections 25 seats had to be renewed. Additionally, any vacant seat would also be renewed. The municipality was divided in 10 multi-member constituencies, corresponding to the city districts. Seats were elected using limited partial block voting. Candidates winning a plurality in each constituency were elected. In districts electing. Voting was on the basis of universal manhood suffrage, which comprised all national males over twenty-five, having at least a two-year residency in a municipality and in full enjoyment of their civil rights.

The Municipal Law allowed the King of Spain to elect directly the Mayor of Barcelona.

== Results ==
← Summary of the 9 November 1913 Barcelona City Council election results →
Party	Vote			Seats		
Party	Votes	%	±pp	Won	Total	+/−
Regionalist League of Catalonia (LR)	30,766	29.31	N/A	11	18	+3
Radical Republican Party (PRR)	30,421	28.98	−3.39	11	21	−3
Republican Nationalist Federal Union (UFNR)	18,475	17.60	−11.08	1	5	−6
Traditionalist Communion (CT)	12,105	11.53	N/A	1	2	+1
Liberal Party (PL)	5,547	5.29	+3.33	1	1	+1
Reformist Party (PR)	5,296	5.05	New	0	2	±0
Guild Union (UG)	2,344	2.23	New	0	0	±0
Independents	1	0.00	±0	0	0	±0
Social Defence Committee (CDS)				−	1	±0
Total	104,955	100.00		25	50	−

Vote share
LR	29.31%
PRR	28.98%
UFNR	17.60%
CT	11.53%
PL	5.29%
PR	5.05%
UG	2.23%
Others	0.00%

City council seats up for election
LR	44.00%
PRR	44.00%
UFNR	4.00%
CT	4.00%
PL	4.00%

=== Results by district ===
District	LR		PRR		UFNR		CT		PL		PR		UG		Oth.	
District	%	S	%	S	%	S	%	S	%	S	%	S	%	S	%	S
I Barceloneta−El Poblenou	0.0	−	52.0	1	30.2	−	0.0	−	12.4	−	0.0	−	5.4	−	0.0	−
II La Ribera	33.1	2	24.7	1	17.5	−	10.6	−	7.4	−	6.6	−	0.0	−	0.0	−
III Barri Gòtic	47.0	2	9.3	−	9.6	−	22.9	1	3.3	−	5.1	−	2.7	−	0.0	−
IV Dreta de l'Eixample	35.1	2	22.6	1	15.9	−	19.3	−	0.0	−	6.0	−	1.0	−	0.0	−
V Raval	25.5	1	40.5	2	17.0	−	7.4	−	0.0	−	4.8	−	4.8	−	0.0	−
VI Esquerra de l'Eixample	36.4	2	25.0	1	17.9	−	11.1	−	2.5	−	6.2	−	0.9	−	0.0	−
VII Sants-Poble Sec	17.9	−	31.9	2	13.3	−	9.9	−	18.6	1	8.3	−	0.0	−	0.0	−
VIII Gràcia	28.6	1	29.2	2	23.6	−	8.0	−	0.7	−	0.0	−	9.8	−	0.0	−
IX Sant Andreu−Horta	35.1	1	24.4	−	30.7	1	8.6	−	0.0	−	1.2	−	0.0	−	0.0	−
X Sant Martí	0.0	−	79.1	1	16.0	−	4.9	−	0.0	−	0.0	−	0.0	−	0.0	−
Total	29.3	11	29.0	11	17.6	1	11.5	1	5.3	1	5.0	−	2.2	−	0.0	−
