= 1915 Barcelona City Council election =

The 1915 Barcelona City Council election was held on Sunday, 14 November 1915, to elect half of the Barcelona City Council. 25 out of 50 seats were up for election.

== Electoral system ==
The number of seats of each council was determined by the population count, according to the 1877 Municipal Law. As Barcelona had more than 200,000 inhabitants, the number of seats composing the city council was 50. The municipal law also established that half of the seats had to be renewed every two years. Therefore, in these elections 25 seats had to be renewed. Additionally, any vacant seat would also be renewed. The municipality was divided in 10 multi-member constituencies, corresponding to the city districts. Seats were elected using limited partial block voting. Candidates winning a plurality in each constituency were elected. In districts electing. Voting was on the basis of universal manhood suffrage, which comprised all national males over twenty-five, having at least a two-year residency in a municipality and in full enjoyment of their civil rights.

The Municipal Law allowed the King of Spain to elect directly the Mayor of Barcelona.

== Results ==
← Summary of the 14 November 1915 Barcelona City Council election results →
Party	Vote			Seats		
Party	Votes	%	±pp	Won	Total	+/−
Radical Republican Party (PRR)	32,942	37.88	+8.90	9	20	−1
Regionalist League of Catalonia (LR)	27,465	31.58	+2.60	9	20	+2
Independent Catalan Nationalist Republicans (Rep.nac.cat)	9,097	10.46	New	3	3	+3
Liberal Party (PL)	8,428	9.69	+4.40	3	4	+3
Traditionalist Communion (CT)	4,796	5.51	−5.99	1	2	±0
Liberal Conservative Party (PLC)	2,501	2.88	New	0	0	±0
Social Defence Committee (CDS)	1,374	1.58	New	0	0	−1
Republican Nationalist Federal Union (UFNR)	317	0.36	−17.24	0	1	−4
Independents	47	0.05	+0.05	0	0	±0
Total	86,967	100.00		25	50	−

Vote share
PRR	37.88%
LR	31.58%
Rep.nac.cat	10.46%
PL	9.69%
CT	5.51%
PLC	2.88%
CDS	1.58%
UFNR	0.36%
Others	0.05%

City council seats up for election
PRR	36.00%
LR	36.00%
Rep.nac.cat	12.00%
PL	12.00%
CT	4.00%

=== Results by district ===
District	PRR		LR		Rep.nac.cat		PL		CT		PLC		CDS		UFNR		Oth.	
District	%	S	%	S	%	S	%	S	%	S	%	S	%	S	%	S	%	S
I Barceloneta−El Poblenou	56.9	1	0.0	−	0.0	−	43.1	1	0.0	−	0.0	−	0.0	−	0.0	−	0.0	−
II La Ribera	42.6	1	46.9	1	0.0	−	0.0	−	3.6	−	7.0	−	0.0	−	0.0	−	0.0	−
III Barri Gòtic	19.9	−	37.8	1	0.0	−	10.0	−	24.2	1	0.0	−	0.0	−	7.2	−	1.1	−
IV Dreta de l'Eixample	0.0	−	29.2	1	33.3	1	0.0	−	0.0	−	13.9	−	23.6	−	0.0	−	0.0	−
V Raval	56.0	2	36.8	1	4.4	−	2.8	−	0.0	−	0.0	−	0.0	−	0.0	−	0.0	−
VI Esquerra de l'Eixample	43.6	1	56.4	2	0.0	−	0.0	−	0.0	−	0.0	−	0.0	−	0.0	−	0.0	−
VII Sants-Poble Sec	37.2	2	15.0	−	19.1	1	15.0	1	13.7	−	0.0	−	0.0	−	0.0	−	0.0	−
VIII Gràcia	40.1	1	45.4	2	0.0	−	6.6	−	0.9	−	7.0	−	0.0	−	0.0	−	0.0	−
IX Sant Andreu−Horta	35.1	−	24.8	1	10.3	−	29.9	1	0.0	−	0.0	−	0.0	−	0.0	−	0.0	−
X Sant Martí	28.6	1	18.6	−	38.2	1	0.0	−	0.0	−	14.6	−	0.0	−	0.0	−	0.0	−
Total	37.9	9	31.6	9	10.5	3	9.7	3	5.5	1	2.9	−	1.6	−	0.4	−	0.1	−
