= 1920 Barcelona City Council election =

The 1920 Barcelona City Council election was held on Sunday, 8 February 1920, to elect half of the Barcelona City Council. 26 out of 50 seats were up for election (1 was a vacant seat).

== Electoral system ==
The number of seats of each council was determined by the population count, according to the 1877 Municipal Law. As Barcelona had more than 200,000 inhabitants, the number of seats composing the city council was 50. The municipal law also established that half of the seats had to be renewed every two years. Therefore, in these elections 25 seats had to be renewed. Additionally, any vacant seat would also be renewed. The municipality was divided in 10 multi-member constituencies, corresponding to the city districts. Seats were elected using limited partial block voting. Candidates winning a plurality in each constituency were elected. In districts electing. Voting was on the basis of universal manhood suffrage, which comprised all national males over twenty-five, having at least a two-year residency in a municipality and in full enjoyment of their civil rights.

The Municipal Law allowed the King of Spain to elect directly the Mayor of Barcelona.

== Results ==
← Summary of the 8 February 1920 Barcelona City Council election results →
Party	Vote			Seats		
Party	Votes	%	±pp	Won	Total	+/−
Regionalist League of Catalonia (LR)	38,238	39.29	−4.18	14	26	+2
Radical Republican Party (PRR)	27,822	28.58	N/A	5	16	−7
National Monarchical Union (UMN)	6,681	6.86	+5.14	2	2	±0
Catalan Republican Party (PRC)	5,758	5.92	New	0	0	±0
Traditionalist Communion (CT)	5,659	5.81	+3.29	2	3	±0
Liberal Party (PL)	4,167	4.28	+1.23	1	1	−2
Independent Catalan Nationalists (Nac.cat.i)	2,513	2.58	New	1	1	+1
Republican Nationalist Federal Union (UFNR)	1,515	1.56	N/A	0	0	±0
Reformist Party (PR)	1,138	1.17	New	0	0	±0
Independent Catalan Nationalist Republicans (Rep.nac.cat)	1,042	1.07	−2.75	0	0	±0
Spanish Socialist Workers' Party (PSOE)	512	0.53	New	0	0	±0
Independents (Indep)	2,288	2.35	−4.24	1	1	+1
Total	97,333	100.00		26	50	−

Vote share
LR	39.29%
PRR	28.58%
UNM	6.86%
PRC	5.92%
CT	5.81%
PL	4.28%
Nac.cat.i	2.58%
UFNR	1.56%
PR	1.17%
Rep.nac.cat	1.07%
PSOE	0.53%
Others	2.35%

City council seats up for election
LR	53.85%
PRR	19.23%
UNM	7.69%
CT	7.69%
PL	3.85%
Nac.cat.i	3.85%
Others	3.85%

=== Results by district ===
District	LR		PRR		UNM		PRC		CT		PL		Nac.cat.i		UFNR		PR		Rep.nac.cat		PSOE		Oth.	
District	%	S	%	S	%	S	%	S	%	S	%	S	%	S	%	S	%	S	%	S	%	S	%	S
I Barceloneta−El Poblenou	32.8	1	38.7	1	20.5	−	2.7	−	0.0	−	0.0	−	0.0	−	4.9	−	0.0	−	0.4	−	0.0	−	0.0	−
II La Ribera	41.7	1	23.2	1	12.4	−	7.0	−	10.4	−	0.0	−	0.0	−	0.0	−	0.0	−	0.0	−	5.5	−	0.0	−
III Barri Gòtic	36.3	1	16.2	−	16.4	−	5.1	−	21.9	1	0.0	−	0.0	−	0.0	−	0.0	−	4.2	−	0.0	−	0.0	−
IV Dreta de l'Eixample	46.7	1	20.1	−	22.7	1	10.6	−	0.0	−	0.0	−	0.0	−	0.0	−	0.0	−	0.0	−	0.0	−	0.0	−
V Raval	43.7	2	44.6	1	4.4	−	7.2	−	0.0	−	0.0	−	0.0	−	0.0	−	0.0	−	0.0	−	0.0	−	0.0	−
VI Esquerra de l'Eixample	60.5	3	20.9	−	8.3	1	3.5	−	0.0	−	0.0	−	0.0	−	0.4	−	5.2	−	0.0	−	1.1	−	0.0	−
VII Sants-Poble Sec	17.8	1	34.8	1	0.0	−	9.7	−	15.7	1	15.8	1	0.0	−	4.7	−	0.0	−	0.0	−	0.0	−	1.6	−
VIII Gràcia	51.0	2	17.0	−	6.8	−	3.8	−	0.0	−	0.0	−	21.4	1	0.0	−	0.0	−	0.0	−	0.0	−	0.0	−
IX Sant Andreu−Horta	28.1	1	19.5	−	0.0	−	0.0	−	0.0	−	0.0	−	0.0	−	0.0	−	0.0	−	11.1	−	0.0	−	41.4	1
X Sant Martí	29.0	1	63.4	1	0.0	−	0.0	−	0.0	−	0.0	−	0.0	−	0.0	−	0.0	−	7.6	−	0.0	−	0.0	−
Total	39.3	14	28.6	5	6.9	2	5.9	−	5.8	2	4.3	1	2.6	1	1.6	−	1.2	−	1.1	−	0.5	−	2.4	1
