= 1905 Barcelona City Council election =

The 1905 Barcelona City Council election was held on Sunday, 12 November 1905, to elect half of the Barcelona City Council. 26 out of 50 seats were up for election (1 was a by-election for a vacant seat).

== Electoral system ==
The number of seats of each council was determined by the population count, according to the 1877 Municipal Law. As Barcelona had more than 200,000 inhabitants, the number of seats composing the city council was 50. The municipal law also established that half of the seats had to be renewed every two years. Therefore, in these elections 25 seats had to be renewed. Additionally, any vacant seat would also be renewed. The municipality was divided in 10 multi-member constituencies, corresponding to the city districts. Seats were elected using limited partial block voting. Candidates winning a plurality in each constituency were elected. In districts electing. Voting was on the basis of universal manhood suffrage, which comprised all national males over twenty-five, having at least a two-year residency in a municipality and in full enjoyment of their civil rights.

The Municipal Law allowed the King of Spain to elect directly the Mayor of Barcelona.

== Results ==
← Summary of the 12 November 1905 Barcelona City Council election results →
Party	Vote			Seats		
Party	Votes	%	±pp	Won	Total	+/−
Republican Union (UR)	29,724	47.82	−23.44	14	31	+2
Regionalist League of Catalonia (LR)	22,491	36.18	−8.58	12	19	+2
Federal Democratic Republican Party (PRDF)	3,198	5.14	New	0	0	±0
Independent Republicans (Rep.i)	2,852	4.59	New	0	0	±0
Social Defence Committee (DS)	1,907	3.07	New	0	0	±0
Monarchists (Mon.)	966	1.55	N/A	0	0	−4
Independent Catalan Nationalist Republicans (Rep.nac.cat)	235	0.38	New	0	0	±0
Independents	789	1.27	+0.13	0	0	±0
Total	62,162	100.00		26	50	−

Vote share
UR	47.82%
LR	36.18%
PRDF	5.14%
Rep.i	4.59%
DS	3.07%
Mon.	1.55%
Rep.nac.cat	0.38%
Others	1.27%

City council seats up for election
UR	53.85%
LR	46.15%

=== Results by district ===
District	UR		LR		PRDF		Rep.i		DS		Mon.		Rep.nac.cat		Oth.	
District	%	S	%	S	%	S	%	S	%	S	%	S	%	S	%	S
I Barceloneta−El Poblenou	66.4	1	0.0	−	23.5	−	0.0	−	10.2	−	0.0	−	0.0	−	0.0	−
II La Ribera	35.0	1	46.4	2	4.1	−	7.7	−	0.0	−	6.8	−	0.0	−	0.0	−
III Barri Gòtic	22.3	−	75.2	3	2.5	−	0.0	−	0.0	−	0.0	−	0.0	−	0.0	−
IV Dreta de l'Eixample	41.3	1	58.7	2	0.0	−	0.0	−	0.0	−	0.0	−	0.0	−	0.0	−
V Raval	59.7	2	20.6	1	12.0	−	2.9	−	0.0	−	4.8	−	0.0	−	0.0	−
VI Esquerra de l'Eixample	43.5	1	49.8	2	1.3	−	4.4	−	0.0	−	0.6	−	0.0	−	0.4	−
VII Sants-Poble Sec	73.3	3	0.0	−	10.1	−	0.0	−	16.6	−	0.0	−	0.0	−	0.0	−
VIII Gràcia	56.9	2	19.5	1	0.0	−	16.6	−	0.0	−	1.5	−	3.7	−	1.7	−
IX Sant Andreu−Horta	38.1	1	29.8	1	0.5	−	11.8	−	0.0	−	0.0	−	0.0	−	19.8	−
X Sant Martí	63.7	2	0.0	−	20.1	−	7.1	−	9.2	−	0.0	−	0.0	−	0.0	−
Total	47.8	14	36.2	12	5.1	−	4.6	−	3.1	−	1.6	−	0.4	−	1.3	−
