= May 1909 Barcelona City Council election =

The May 1909 Barcelona City Council election was held on Sunday, 2 May 1909, to elect half of the Barcelona City Council. 28 out of 50 seats were up for election (3 were vacant seats).

== Electoral system ==
The number of seats of each council was determined by the population count, according to the 1877 Municipal Law. As Barcelona had more than 200,000 inhabitants, the number of seats composing the city council was 50. The municipal law also established that half of the seats had to be renewed every two years. Therefore, in these elections 25 seats had to be renewed. Additionally, any vacant seat would also be renewed. The municipality was divided in 10 multi-member constituencies, corresponding to the city districts. Seats were elected using limited partial block voting. Candidates winning a plurality in each constituency were elected. In districts electing. Voting was on the basis of universal manhood suffrage, which comprised all national males over twenty-five, having at least a two-year residency in a municipality and in full enjoyment of their civil rights.

The Municipal Law allowed the King of Spain to elect directly the Mayor of Barcelona.

== Results ==
← Summary of the 2 May 1909 Barcelona City Council election results →
Party	Vote			Seats		
Party	Votes	%	±pp	Won	Total	+/−
Radical Republican Party (PRR)	63,231	40.48	−7.84	16	25	−6
Federal Democratic Republican Party (PRDF)	45,223	28.95	+23.81	8	11	+11
Regionalist League of Catalonia (LR)	38,728	24.80	−11.38	4	14	−5
Social Defence Committee (DS)	6,949	4.45	+1.38	0	0	±0
Traditionalist Communion (CT)	1,233	0.79	New	0	0	±0
Liberal Party (PL)	578	0.37	N/A	0	0	±0
Independent Republicans (Rep.i)	245	0.16	−1.11	0	0	±0
Total	156,187	100.00		28	50	−

Vote share
PRR	40.48%
PRDF	28.95%
LR	24.80%
DS	4.45%
CT	0.79%
PL	0.37%
Rep.i	0.16%

City council seats up for election
PRR	57.14%
PRDF	28.57%
LR	14.29%

=== Results by district ===
District	PRR		PRDF		LR		DS		CT		PL		Rep.i	
District	%	S	%	S	%	S	%	S	%	S	%	S	%	S
I Barceloneta−El Poblenou	65.3	2	17.4	−	14.5	−	0.0	−	0.0	−	2.8	−	0.0	−
II La Ribera	34.6	1	25.8	−	29.1	1	5.8	−	0.0	−	4.8	−	0.0	−
III Barri Gòtic	19.3	−	32.1	2	30.5	1	9.4	−	8.8	−	0.0	−	0.0	−
IV Dreta de l'Eixample	29.0	1	27.1	−	31.1	1	12.8	−	0.0	−	0.0	−	0.0	−
V Raval	46.7	2	28.4	1	22.2	−	2.7	−	0.0	−	0.0	−	0.0	−
VI Esquerra de l'Eixample	36.8	2	29.4	1	26.3	−	7.5	−	0.0	−	0.0	−	0.0	−
VII Sants-Poble Sec	49.5	3	28.8	2	20.6	−	1.1	−	0.0	−	0.0	−	0.0	−
VIII Gràcia	37.5	3	32.3	1	26.1	−	4.1	−	0.0	−	0.0	−	0.0	−
IX Sant Andreu−Horta	37.2	1	32.6	1	30.2	−	0.0	−	0.0	−	0.0	−	0.0	−
X Sant Martí	53.4	1	20.8	−	20.9	1	0.0	−	0.0	−	0.0	−	4.9	−
Total	40.5	16	29.0	8	24.8	4	4.4	−	0.8	−	0.4	−	0.2	−
