= 1917 Barcelona City Council election =

The 1917 Barcelona City Council election was held on Sunday, 11 November 1917, to elect half of the Barcelona City Council. 26 out of 50 seats were up for election (1 was a vacant seat).

== Electoral system ==
The number of seats of each council was determined by the population count, according to the 1877 Municipal Law. As Barcelona had more than 200,000 inhabitants, the number of seats composing the city council was 50. The municipal law also established that half of the seats had to be renewed every two years. Therefore, in these elections 25 seats had to be renewed. Additionally, any vacant seat would also be renewed. The municipality was divided in 10 multi-member constituencies, corresponding to the city districts. Seats were elected using limited partial block voting. Candidates winning a plurality in each constituency were elected. In districts electing. Voting was on the basis of universal manhood suffrage, which comprised all national males over twenty-five, having at least a two-year residency in a municipality and in full enjoyment of their civil rights.

The Municipal Law allowed the King of Spain to elect directly the Mayor of Barcelona.

== Results ==
← Summary of the 11 November 1917 Barcelona City Council election results →
Party	Vote			Seats		
Party	Votes	%	±pp	Won	Total	+/−
Regionalist League of Catalonia (LR)	40,482	43.47	+11.89	13	22	+2
Republican Coalition (PRR–UFNR)	36,162	38.83	+0.58	12	23	−1
Independent Catalan Nationalist Republicans (Rep.nac.cat)	3,556	3.82	−6.64	0	0	±0
Liberal Party (PL)	2,841	3.05	−6.64	0	3	−1
Traditionalist Communion (CT)	2,343	2.52	−2.99	1	2	±0
Maurist Conservatives (M)	1,600	1.72	New	0	0	±0
Independents (Indep)	6,135	6.59	+6.59	0	0	±0
Total	93,119	100.00		26	50	−

Vote share
LR	43.47%
PRR-UFNR	38.83%
Rep.nac.cat	3.82%
PL	3.05%
CT	2.52%
M	1.72%
Others	6.59%

City council seats up for election
LR	50.00%
PRR-UFNR	46.15%
CT	3.85%

=== Results by district ===
District	LR		PRR–UFNR		Rep.nac.cat		PL		CT		M		Oth.	
District	%	S	%	S	%	S	%	S	%	S	%	S	%	S
I Barceloneta−El Poblenou	12.0	−	53.5	1	0.0	−	0.0	−	0.0	−	0.0	−	34.5	−
II La Ribera	54.6	2	37.9	1	0.0	−	7.5	−	0.0	−	0.0	−	0.0	−
III Barri Gòtic	63.1	2	13.4	−	0.0	−	0.0	−	17.1	1	5.9	−	0.5	−
IV Dreta de l'Eixample	58.3	2	29.1	1	0.0	−	0.0	−	0.0	−	10.0	−	2.5	−
V Raval	39.8	1	53.1	2	0.9	−	6.3	−	0.0	−	0.0	−	0.0	−
VI Esquerra de l'Eixample	62.6	2	37.4	1	0.0	−	0.0	−	0.0	−	0.0	−	0.0	−
VII Sants-Poble Sec	16.1	1	50.6	3	12.8	−	5.3	−	6.4	−	0.0	−	8.8	−
VIII Gràcia	49.5	2	33.8	1	0.0	−	0.0	−	0.0	−	1.3	−	15.4	−
IX Sant Andreu−Horta	27.4	1	26.2	1	10.8	−	13.0	−	0.0	−	0.0	−	22.7	−
X Sant Martí	36.8	−	41.7	1	21.5	−	0.0	−	0.0	−	0.0	−	0.0	−
Total	43.5	13	38.8	12	3.8	−	3.1	−	2.5	1	1.7	−	6.6	−
