= 1903 Barcelona City Council election =

The 1903 Barcelona City Council election was held on Sunday, 8 November 1903, to elect half of the Barcelona City Council. 25 out of 50 seats were up for election.

Horta was annexed to Barcelona by decree on 9 July 1903, but it didn't go into effect until 1 January 1904, when the elected members of this election took power.

== Electoral system ==
The number of seats of each council was determined by the population count, according to the 1877 Municipal Law. As Barcelona had more than 200,000 inhabitants, the number of seats composing the city council was 50. The municipal law also established that half of the seats had to be renewed every two years. Therefore, in the 1903 elections 25 seats were up for grabs. Additionally, any vacant seat would also be renewed. The municipality was divided into 10 multi-member constituencies, corresponding to the city districts. Seats were elected using limited partial block voting. Candidates winning a plurality in each constituency were elected. In districts electing. Voting was on the basis of universal manhood suffrage, which comprised all national males over twenty-five, having at least a two-year residency in a municipality and in full enjoyment of their civil rights.

The Municipal Law allowed the King of Spain to elect directly the Mayor of Barcelona.

== Results ==
← Summary of the 8 November 1903 Barcelona City Council election results →
Party	Vote			Seats		
Party	Votes	%	±pp	Won	Total	+/−
Republican Union (UR)	47,892	71.26	−	18	29	+12
Regionalist League of Catalonia (LR)	18,552	27.60	−	7	17	±0
Independents	768	1.14	−	0	0	−3
Liberal Party (PL)				−	4	−4
Total	67,212	100.00		25	50	−

Vote share
UR	71.26%
LR	27.60%
Others	1.14%

City council seats up for election
UR	72.00%
LR	28.00%

=== Results by district ===
District	UR		LR		Oth.	
District	%	S	%	S	%	S
I Barceloneta−El Poblenou	67.8	2	25.5	−	6.7	−
II La Ribera	59.5	1	40.5	1	0.0	−
III Barri Gòtic	36.5	1	63.5	1	0.0	−
IV Dreta de l'Eixample	53.1	1	46.9	1	0.0	−
V Raval	69.4	2	30.6	1	0.0	−
VI Esquerra de l'Eixample	60.1	2	38.2	1	1.7	−
VII Sants-Poble Sec	85.2	3	14.8	1	0.0	−
VIII Gràcia	76.2	2	23.8	1	0.0	−
IX Sant Andreu−Horta	84.8	2	0.0	−	15.2	−
X Sant Martí	88.3	2	11.7	−	0.0	−
Total	71.3	18	27.6	7	1.1	−
