= December 1909 Barcelona City Council election =

The December 1909 Barcelona City Council election was held on Sunday, 12 December 1909, to elect half of the Barcelona City Council. 25 out of 50 seats were up for election. These were the first elections after the Tragic Week (August 1909).

== Electoral system ==
The number of seats of each council was determined by the population count, according to the 1877 Municipal Law. As Barcelona had more than 200,000 inhabitants, the number of seats composing the city council was 50. The municipal law also established that half of the seats had to be renewed every two years. Therefore, in these elections 25 seats had to be renewed. Additionally, any vacant seat would also be renewed. The municipality was divided in 10 multi-member constituencies, corresponding to the city districts. Seats were elected using limited partial block voting. Candidates winning a plurality in each constituency were elected. In districts electing. Voting was on the basis of universal manhood suffrage, which comprised all national males over twenty-five, having at least a two-year residency in a municipality and in full enjoyment of their civil rights.

The Municipal Law allowed the King of Spain to elect directly the Mayor of Barcelona.

== Results ==
← Summary of 12 December 1909 Barcelona City Council election results →
Party	Vote			Seats		
Party	Votes	%	±pp	Won	Total	+/−
Radical Republican Party (PRR)	57,201	40.95	+0.47	14	29	+4
Federal Democratic Republican Party (PRDF)	43,554	31.18	+2.23	6	13	+2
Regionalist League of Catalonia (LR)	34,558	24.74	−0.06	5	8	−6
Liberal Party (PL)	3,652	2.61	+2.24	0	0	±0
Independent Republicans (Rep.i)	710	0.51	+0.35	0	0	±0
Total	139,675	100.00		25	50	−

Vote share
PRR	40.95%
PRDF	31.18%
LR	24.74%
PL	2.61%
Rep.i	0.51%

City council seats up for election
PRR	56.00%
PRDF	24.00%
LR	20.00%

=== Results by district ===
District	PRR		PRDF		LR		PL		Rep.i	
District	%	S	%	S	%	S	%	S	%	S
I Barceloneta−El Poblenou	71.3	1	28.7	−	0.0	−	0.0	−	0.0	−
II La Ribera	36.6	2	24.8	−	30.2	1	4.9	−	3.5	−
III Barri Gòtic	34.5	−	12.9	1	52.6	2	0.0	−	0.0	−
IV Dreta de l'Eixample	30.5	1	29.2	−	40.3	2	0.0	−	0.0	−
V Raval	45.8	2	36.0	1	15.1	−	3.1	−	0.0	−
VI Esquerra de l'Eixample	34.6	2	31.6	1	31.1	−	2.1	−	0.6	−
VII Sants-Poble Sec	53.1	2	39.3	1	0.0	−	7.6	−	0.0	−
VIII Gràcia	36.1	2	36.2	1	27.6	−	0.0	−	0.0	−
IX Sant Andreu−Horta	38.4	1	33.1	1	28.5	−	0.0	−	0.0	−
X Sant Martí	64.6	1	32.4	−	0.0	−	2.9	−	0.0	−
Total	41.0	14	31.2	6	24.7	5	2.6	−	0.5	−
