= 1934 Barcelona City Council election =

- 14 January 1934

All 40 seats in the Barcelona City Council 21 seats needed for a majority
	First party	Second party
Leader	Carles Pi i Sunyer	Lluís Duran Ventosa
Party	Catalan Left	Catalan League
Leader since	1934	1934
Last election	25	12
Seats won	26	10
Seat change	▲1	▼2
Popular vote	162,476	133,710
Percentage	50.2%	41.3%
- Results by district
Mayor before election
Jaume Aiguader i Miró
Republican Left of Catalonia
Elected Mayor
Carles Pi i Sunyer
Republican Left of Catalonia

The 1934 Barcelona City Council election was held on Sunday, 14 January 1934, to elect the Barcelona City Council, the unicameral local legislature of the municipality of Barcelona, together with the other 1,029 Catalan municipalities. At stake were all 40 seats in the City Council, determining the Mayor of Barcelona. These were the first local elections where women were able to vote.

== Electoral system ==
According to the 1932 Statute of Autonomy, the competences on local elections were devolved to the Catalan Government. The electoral system was determined by the Municipal Law. The number of seats in the Barcelona City Council consisted of 40 members.

All City Council members were elected in a single multi-member district, consisting of the Barcelona municipality, using closed lists party block voting: the winning party in number of votes would win the 66% of the seats, the second party would win the 66% of the unfilled seats, and so on. Voting was on the basis of universal suffrage in a secret ballot.

== Results ==
← Summary of the 14 January 1934 Barcelona City Council election results →
Party	Vote			Seats	
Party	Votes	%	±pp	Won	+/−
Catalan Left (ERC-USC-ACR-PNRE)	162,476	50.17	▲19.43	26	▲1
Catalan League (LC)	133,710	41.29	▲19.68	10	▼2
Radical Republican Party (PRR)	20,914	6.46	▼14.08	4	▼8
Workers and Peasants' Bloc (BOC)	1,970	0.61	▼0.62	0	±0
Catalan National Party (PNC)	1,929	0.60	▼12.44	0	±0
Catalan Communist Party (PCC)	1,454	0.45	New	0	±0
Federal Far Left (EEF)	619	0.19	New	0	±0
Blank ballots	755	0.23	N/A		
Total	323,827	100.00		40	▼10
Valid votes	323,827	99.88	N/A		
Invalid votes	397	0.12	N/A		
Votes cast / turnout	324,224	56.82	N/A		
Abstentions	246,345	43.18	N/A		
Registered voters	570,569				
Source: La vanguardia, 19-1-1934, p.6

Vote share
ERC-USC-ACR-PNRE	50.17%
LC	41.29%
PRR	6.46%
BOC	0.61%
ACR	0.60%
PCC	0.45%
EEF	0.19%
Blank ballots	0.23%

City council seats
ERC-USC-ACR-PNRE	65.00%
LR	25.00%
PRR	10.00%

=== Results by district ===
District	ERC	LC	PRR	BOC	PNC	PCC	EEF
I Barceloneta−Ciutat Vella	45.5	45.3	6.8	0.5	0.9	0.2	0.6
II Poble-sec−Montjuïc	58.5	30.2	9.3	0.6	0.6	0.2	0.5
III Les Corts−Sarrià	34.6	60.7	3.1	0.3	0.7	0.1	0.3
IV Dreta de l'Eixample	33.4	59.7	4.9	0.3	0.6	0.3	0.6
V Raval	56.4	32.1	8.3	1.1	0.7	0.4	0.8
VI Esquerra de l'Eixample	36.7	55.5	6.3	0.1	0.7	0.1	0.4
VII Hostafrancs−Sants	61.3	30.1	6.5	0.6	0.4	0.2	0.7
VIII Gràcia	50.5	42.8	5.1	0.2	0.6	0.1	0.5
IX Sant Andreu−Horta	60.7	30.8	6.3	0.4	0.5	0.3	0.9
X Sant Martí	63.4	25.9	8.7	0.6	0.4	0.2	0.7
Total	50.2	41.3	6.5	0.5	0.6	0.2	0.6

=== Councillors elected ===
- Catalan Left (ERC-USC-ACR-PNRE)
  - Carles Pi Sunyer (ERC)
  - Jaume Serra Húnter (ERC)
  - Estanislau Duran Reinals(ACR)
  - Antoni Ventós Casadevall (ERC)
  - Antoni Vilalta Vidal (PNRE)
  - Marià Martínez Cuenca (USC)
  - Jaume Vàchier Pallé (ERC)
  - Josep Escofet Andreu (ERC)
  - Ferran Boter Mauri (ACR)
  - Francesc Carbonell Vila (ERC)
  - Hilari Salvadó Castell (ERC)
  - Vicenç Bernades Biusà (ERC)
  - Domènec Pla Blanco (ERC)
  - Emili Granier Barrera (USC)
  - Josep Gispert Vila (ERC)
  - Francesc Godó i Roc (ERC)
  - Tomàs Pumarola Julià (ACR)
  - Ot Hurtado i Martí (ACR)
  - Benet Mori i Ballester (ERC)
  - Antoni Oliva i Oliva (ERC)
  - Ricard Altaba i Planuc (PNRE)
  - Francesc Rosell i Montaner (USC)
  - Joan Codomí i Pujolar (ERC)
  - Josep Maria Masip i Izàbal (ERC)
  - Ramon Junyent i Vila (ERC)
  - Cristià Cortés i Lladó (ERC)
- Catalan League (LC)
  - Lluís Duran Ventosa
  - Josep Codolà Gualdo
  - Frederic Roda Ventura
  - Octavi Saltor Soler
  - Xavier Calderó Coronas
  - Andreu Bausili Sanromà
  - Francesc Vendrell Tiana
  - Francesc de Sagarra de Castellarnau
  - Joan Soler Janer
  - Josep Maria Blanc Romeu
- Radical Republican Party (PRR)
  - Luis Matutano Casanovas
  - José Matheu Ferrer
  - Pedro Domènech Seriñana
  - Federico Frigola Palau
