= 1922 Barcelona City Council election =

The 1922 Barcelona City Council election was held on Sunday, 5 February 1922, to elect half of the Barcelona City Council. 25 out of 50 seats were up for election.

== Electoral system ==
The number of seats of each council was determined by the population count, according to the 1877 Municipal Law. As Barcelona had more than 200,000 inhabitants, the number of seats composing the city council was 50. The municipal law also established that half of the seats had to be renewed every two years. Therefore, in these elections 25 seats had to be renewed. Additionally, any vacant seat would also be renewed, but it was not the case in these elections. The municipality was divided in 10 multi-member constituencies, corresponding to the city districts. Seats were elected using limited partial block voting. Candidates winning a plurality in each constituency were elected. In districts electing. Voting was on the basis of universal manhood suffrage, which comprised all national males over twenty-five, having at least a two-year residency in a municipality and in full enjoyment of their civil rights.

The Municipal Law allowed the King of Spain to elect directly the Mayor of Barcelona.

== Results ==
← Summary of the 5 February 1922 Barcelona City Council election results →
Party	Vote			Seats		
Party	Votes	%	±pp	Won	Total	+/−
Regionalist League of Catalonia (LR)	36,756	45.16	+5.87	15	28	+2
Radical Republican Party (PRR)	29,282	35.98	+7.40	8	14	-3
National Monarchical Union (UMN)	5,994	7.36	+0.50	0	3	±0
Traditionalist Communion (CT)	2,911	3.58	-2.23	2	4	+1
Independents (Indep)	6,450	7.92	+5.57	0	1	±0
Total	81,393	100.00		25	50	−

Vote share
LR	45.16%
PRR	35.98%
UNM	7.36%
CT	3.58%
Others	7.92%

City council seats up for election
LR	60.00%
PRR	32.00%
CT	8.00%

=== Results by district ===
District	LR		PRR		UNM		CT		Oth.	
District	%	S	%	S	%	S	%	S	%	S
I Barceloneta−El Poblenou	34.3	−	63.5	1	2.2	−	0.0	−	0.0	−
II La Ribera	51.1	2	38.7	1	10.2	−	0.0	−	0.0	−
III Barri Gòtic	50.2	2	11.0	−	16.0	−	22.8	1	0.0	−
IV Dreta de l'Eixample	43.9	2	7.9	−	15.6	−	19.8	1	12.8	−
V Raval	33.1	1	62.1	2	4.8	−	0.0	−	0.0	−
VI Esquerra de l'Eixample	53.2	2	24.5	1	12.8	−	0.0	−	9.5	−
VII Sants-Poble Sec	37.6	1	53.1	2	0.0	−	0.0	−	9.4	−
VIII Gràcia	63.6	3	8.6	−	12.8	−	0.0	−	15.1	−
IX Sant Andreu−Horta	37.3	1	35.3	1	0.0	−	0.0	−	27.5	−
X Sant Martí	45.5	1	54.5	−	0.0	−	0.0	−	0.0	−
Total	45.2	15	36.0	8	7.4	−	3.6	2	7.9	−
