= 1901 Barcelona City Council election =

The 1901 Barcelona City Council election was held on Sunday, 10 November 1901, to elect half of the Barcelona City Council. 26 out of 50 seats were up for election (1 was a vacant seat).

== Electoral system ==
The number of seats of each council was determined by the population count, according to the 1877 Municipal Law. As Barcelona had more than 200,000 inhabitants, the number of seats composing the city council was 50. The municipal law also established that half of the seats had to be renewed every two years. Therefore, in these elections 25 seats had to be renewed. Additionally, any vacant seat would also be renewed. The municipality was divided in 10 multi-member constituencies, corresponding to the city districts. Seats were elected using limited partial block voting. Candidates winning a plurality in each constituency were elected. In districts electing. Voting was on the basis of universal manhood suffrage, which comprised all national males over twenty-five, having at least a two-year residency in a municipality and in full enjoyment of their civil rights.

The Municipal Law allowed the King of Spain to elect directly the Mayor of Barcelona.

== Results ==
← Summary of the 10 November 1901 Barcelona City Council election results →
Party	Vote			Seats		
Party	Votes	%	±pp	Won	Total	+/−
Republicans (Rep.)	21,869	38.69	−	11	12	−
Regionalist League of Catalonia (LR)	20,457	36.19	−	11	17	−
Liberal Party (PL)	13,889	24.57	−	4	8	−
National Union (UN)	177	0.31	−	0	0	−
Spanish Socialist Workers' Party (PSOE)	127	0.22	−	0	1	−
Liberal Conservative Party (PLC)				0	9	−
Independents				0	3	−
Total	56,519	100.00		26	50	−

Vote share
Rep.	38.69%
LR	36.19%
PL	24.57%
UN	0.31%
PSOE	0.22%

City council seats up for election
Rep.	42.31%
LR	42.31%
PL	15.38%

=== Results by district ===
District	Rep.		LR		PL		UN		PSOE	
District	%	S	%	S	%	S	%	S	%	S
I Barceloneta−El Poblenou	62.8	1	26.9	−	10.4	−	0.0	−	0.0	−
II La Ribera	20.8	−	50.6	2	26.5	1	0.0	−	2.0	−
III Barri Gòtic	14.3	−	62.2	3	22.8	−	0.7	−	0.0	−
IV Dreta de l'Eixample	30.6	1	60.4	2	9.0	−	0.0	−	0.0	−
V Raval	28.4	1	31.4	−	39.3	2	0.9	−	0.0	−
VI Esquerra de l'Eixample	33.2	1	40.1	2	25.8	−	0.8	−	0.0	−
VII Sants-Poble Sec	60.3	2	0.0	−	39.7	1	0.0	−	0.0	−
VIII Gràcia	50.7	2	49.3	1	0.0	−	0.0	−	0.0	−
IX Sant Andreu	58.3	2	16.6	1	25.2	−	0.0	−	0.0	−
X Sant Martí	74.3	1	0.0	−	25.7	−	0.0	−	0.0	−
Total	38.7	11	36.2	11	24.6	4	0.3	−	0.2	−
