= Joaquín de Bolós y Saderra =

Spanish lawyer and politician

Joaquín de Bolós y Saderra (Olot, September 21, 1854 – Barcelona, 1937) was a Spanish lawyer, publicist, historian, and politician who served on the Barcelona City Council on several occasions.

A supporter of Carlism, he is known for his writings on the Third Carlist War in Catalonia and the conspiracy that preceded it.
