= Eixample =

District of Barcelona

- District of Barcelona
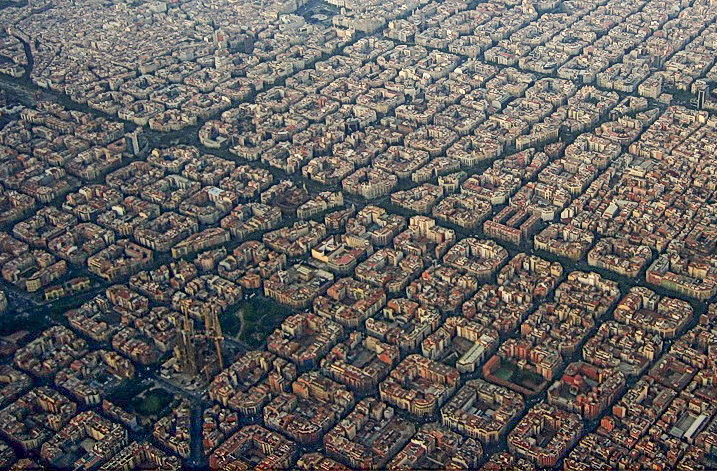
- Aerial view of the Eixample

- Location of the Eixample within Barcelona
- Interactive map of Eixample
- Coordinates: 41°23′27″N 2°09′47″E
- Country: Spain
- Autonomous Community: Catalonia
- Province: Barcelona
- Comarca: Barcelonès
- Municipality: Barcelona
- Neighborhoods: Fort Pienc, Sagrada Família, Dreta de l'Eixample, L'Antiga Esquerra de l'Eixample, La Nova Esquerra de l'Eixample, Sant Antoni

Area
  - Total: 7.48 km^{2} (2.89 sq mi)

Population (2009)
  - Total: 266,874
  - Density: 35,700/km^{2} (92,400/sq mi)
- Demonym(s): eixamplenc, -enca
- Website: bcn.cat/eixample

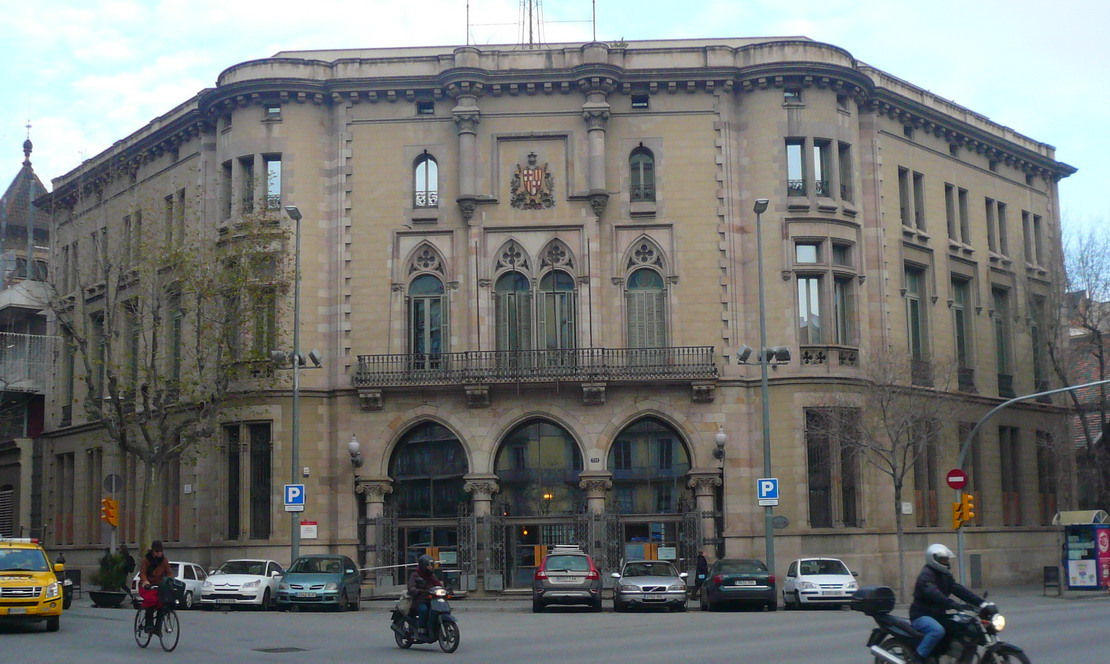
District hall

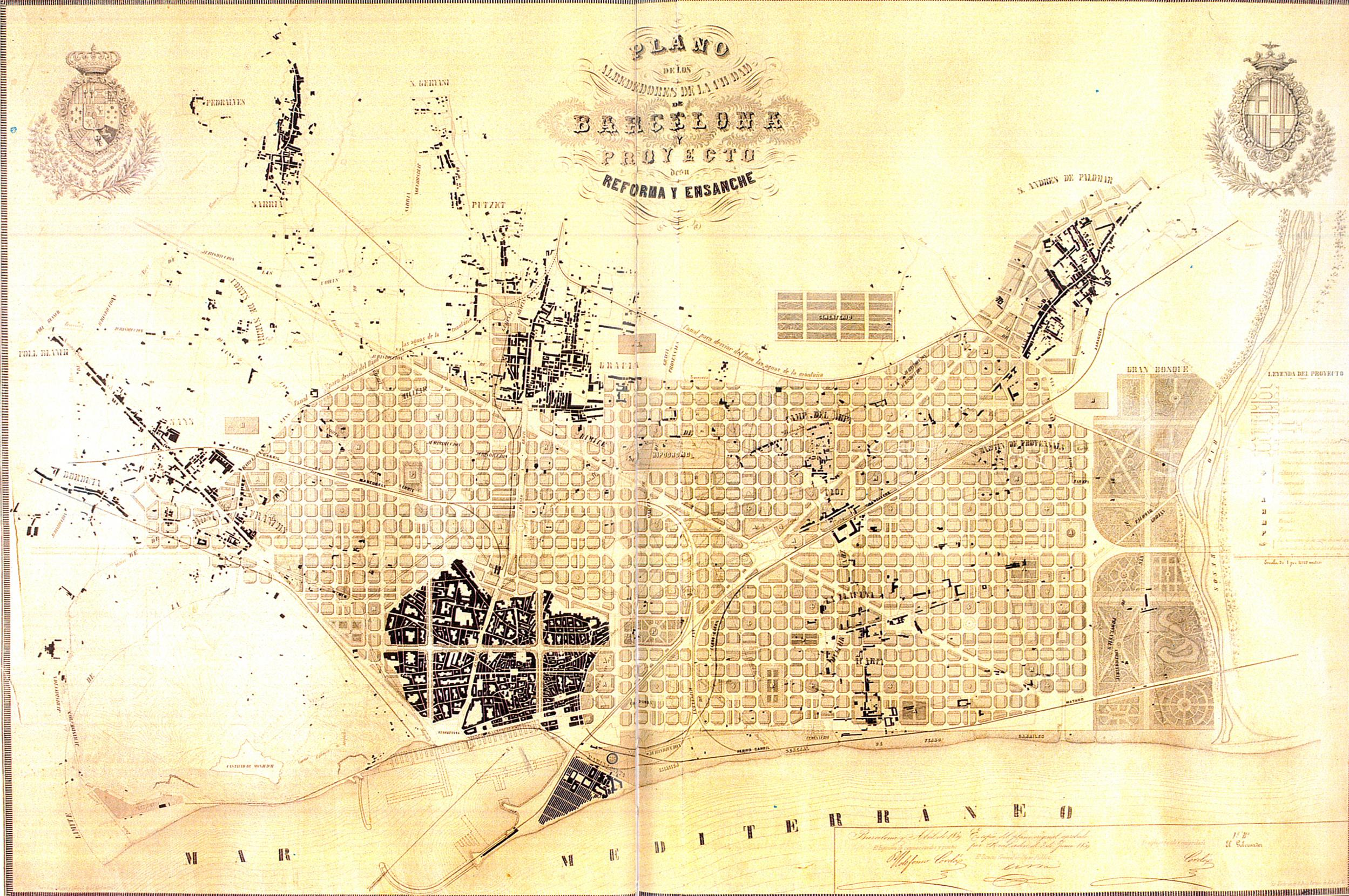
Original Eixample concept from 1859

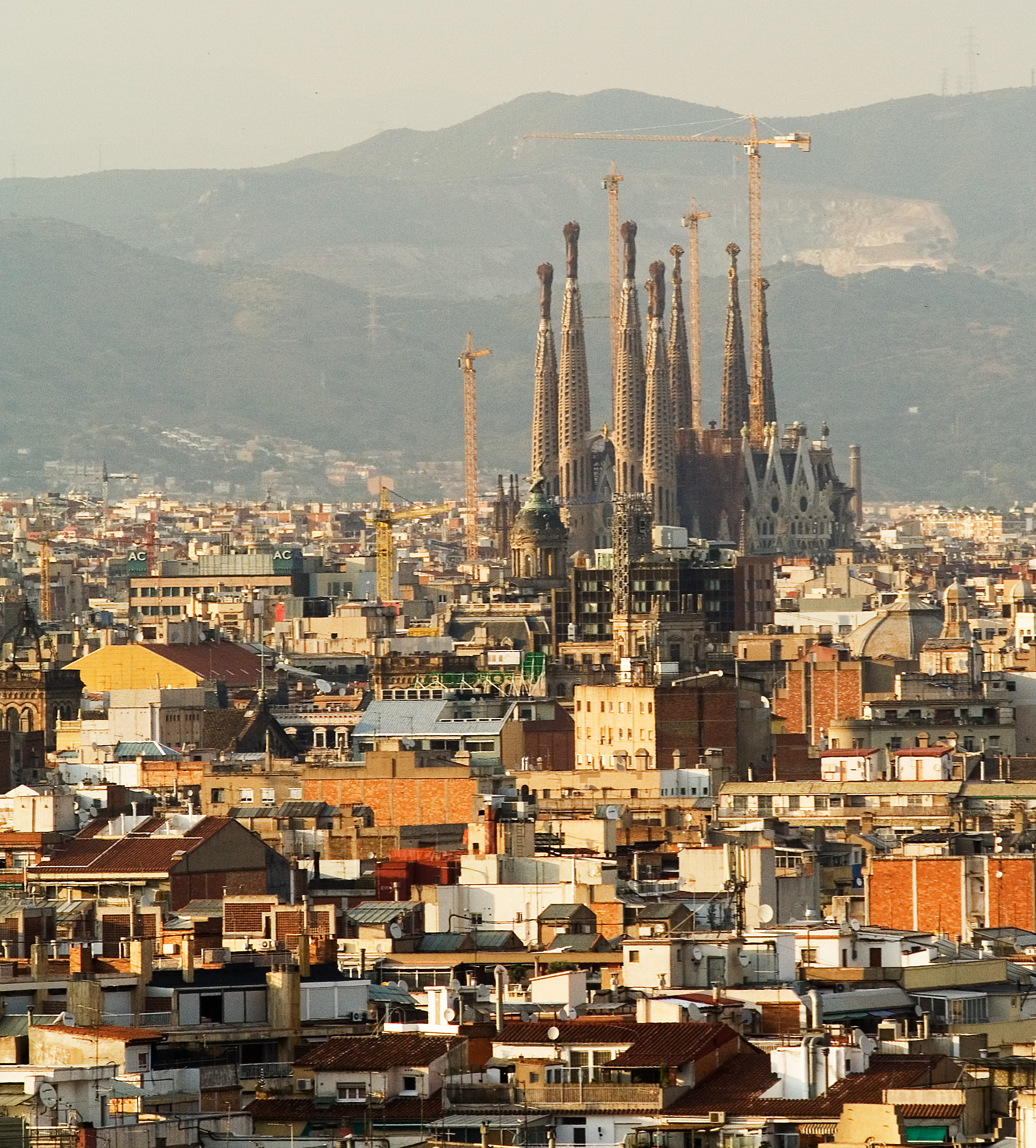
Part of the Eixample and the Sagrada Família, viewed from Montjuïc, June 2006

Eixample street and block layout

The Eixample (Catalan: [əˈʃamplə] 'Expansion'; Spanish: Ensanche [enˈsantʃe]) is a district of Barcelona between the old city (Ciutat Vella) and what were once surrounding small towns (Sants, Gràcia, Sant Andreu, etc.), constructed in the 19th and early 20th centuries. Its population was 262,000 at the last census (2005).

== Architecture and design ==
The Eixample is characterized by long straight streets, a strict grid pattern crossed by wide avenues, and square blocks with chamfered corners (named illes in Catalan, manzanas in Spanish).

This was a design plan by Ildefons Cerdà, who considered traffic and transport along with sunlight and ventilation in coming up with his characteristic octagonal blocks, where the streets broaden at every intersection making for greater visibility, better ventilation and (today) some short-term parking areas.

It also provided an area for horse-drawn wagons and carriages to easily turn around. The grid pattern remains as a hallmark of Barcelona, but many of his other provisions were ignored: the four sides of the blocks and the inner space were built instead of the planned two or three sides around a garden; the streets were narrower; only one of the two diagonal avenues was carried out; the inhabitants were of a higher class than the mixed composition dreamed of by Cerdà.

The important needs of the inhabitants were incorporated into his plan, which called for markets, schools, hospitals every so many blocks. Today, most of the markets remain open in the spots they have been from the beginning.

Some parts of the Eixample were influenced by Modernista architects, chief among whom was Antoni Gaudí. His work in the Eixample includes the Casa Milà (nicknamed La Pedrera) and the Casa Batlló, both of which are on the wide Passeig de Gràcia, as well as the Sagrada Família. Other architects who made highly significant, and certainly more numerous, contributions to giving the Eixample its characteristic appearance include Josep Puig i Cadafalch, Josep Domènech i Estapà, Josep Vilaseca i Casanovas and perhaps above all Enric Sagnier i Villavecchia, responsible for a total of over 500 buildings in the city (not all of them in the Eixample).

The Casa Terrades, better known as Casa de les Punxes and replete with medieval allusions, stands at the junction of Av. Diagonal with Carrer Rosselló. It was built in 1903–1905 by the Modernista architect Josep Puig i Cadafalch, who used Nordic Gothic and Spanish Plateresque resources side by side, along with traditional Catalan motifs.

The Casa Batlló is part of a block called the Illa de la Discòrdia, along with two other notable Modernista works, Lluís Domènech i Montaner's Casa Lleó Morera and Josep Puig i Cadafalch's Casa Amatller. The block is so named due to the visual clash between the buildings; its Spanish name, Manzana de la Discordia, is also a pun on Eris's Apple of Discord – manzana means both "apple" and "city block".

The square architecture of Eixample was the main inspiration for the controversial jersey checkerboard design introduced by FC Barcelona in 2019 instead of the traditional stripes, and used until the following year.

== Neighborhoods ==
There are six administrative neighborhoods:

- L'Antiga Esquerra de l'Eixample (in the past, part of Esquerra de l'Eixample)
- La Nova Esquerra de l'Eixample (in the past, part of Esquerra de l'Eixample)
- Dreta de l'Eixample
- Fort Pienc
- Sagrada Família
- Sant Antoni

The district is often divided for practical purposes in two: Esquerra de l'Eixample and Dreta de l'Eixample (left and right sides of Eixample, respectively). Traditionally and officially, it is divided into five neighborhoods.

These are, in addition to the areas already mentioned, Sant Antoni, Sagrada Família and Fort Pienc, also known as Fort Pius.

The latter has recently become notable for the number of Asian, chiefly Chinese residents and the proliferation of Asian shops.

Some parts of Eixample are rather wealthy neighborhoods, especially around the central areas such as Passeig de Gràcia, Rambla de Catalunya, pedestrian streets such as Carrer de Girona and the Avinguda Gaudi and vicinity of the Sagrada Familia.

== Environment ==
According to data published by Barcelona City Council in January 2026, Eixample recorded the highest nitrogen dioxide (NO_{2}) concentration in the city in 2025, with an annual average of 29 μg/m^{3} — a reduction of 4 μg/m^{3} compared to 2024, but still the highest level among all city districts. The environmental group Eixample Respira has contested the official figures, arguing that traffic restrictions due to construction works on Carrer d'Urgell artificially lowered readings at the monitoring station.

== Main thoroughfares ==
Passeig de Gràcia connects the central Plaça Catalunya to the old town of Gràcia, while Avinguda Diagonal cuts across the grid diagonally and Gran Via de les Corts Catalanes runs across the entire city from southwest to northeast.

Other wide avenues in the area include Carrer d'Aragó, Carrer de Balmes and Passeig de Sant Joan.

== Education ==
There is a Japanese library in Eixample that opened in 1992. Most of the patrons are Japanese, though locals may also use the facilities. The library is located inside a flat.

== See also ==
- List of streets and squares in Eixample
- Districts of Barcelona
- Urban planning of Barcelona
- Street names in Barcelona
- Plain of Barcelona
