= Vania Arana =

Peruvian trade unionist (born 1967)

Vania Arana (born 1967) is a Peruvian trade unionist who lives and works in Catalonia, Spain. She is the founder of the Las Kellys movement, which defends the rights of hotel maids working in Spain.

== Biography ==
Arana was born in Trujillo, Peru in 1967. After graduating with a degree in literacy studies, she worked for a time as a teacher.

In 1992, Arana migrated to Barcelona, Spain, where her university degree was not recognised. To support herself, she worked in nursing homes and launderettes. Arana later moved as a chambermaid in a hotel, where she experienced the sector's poor working conditions.

In 2014, a Barcelona hotel chain fired several maids, worsening work conditions for the remaining employees. Arana and her colleagues filed a lawsuit, which led to the fired maids being rehired. The maids were also incorporated into the staff of Hilton Hotels & Resorts.

In 2016, Arana led the creation of Las Kellys, an organisation to defend the rights of hotel maids, as well as for the profession to be legally recognised. In 2017, she was one of the narrators of the animated documentary short film Organising the (Im)possible, which followed the daily lives of hotel maids. In 2018, the Catalan branch of Las Kellys became a trade union, with Arana as its president and spokesperson.

== Recognition ==
In 2023, Arana was honoured by the City Council of Barcelona as part of its City of Women (Catalan: Ciutat de Dones) campaign.
