= Cases Marfà =

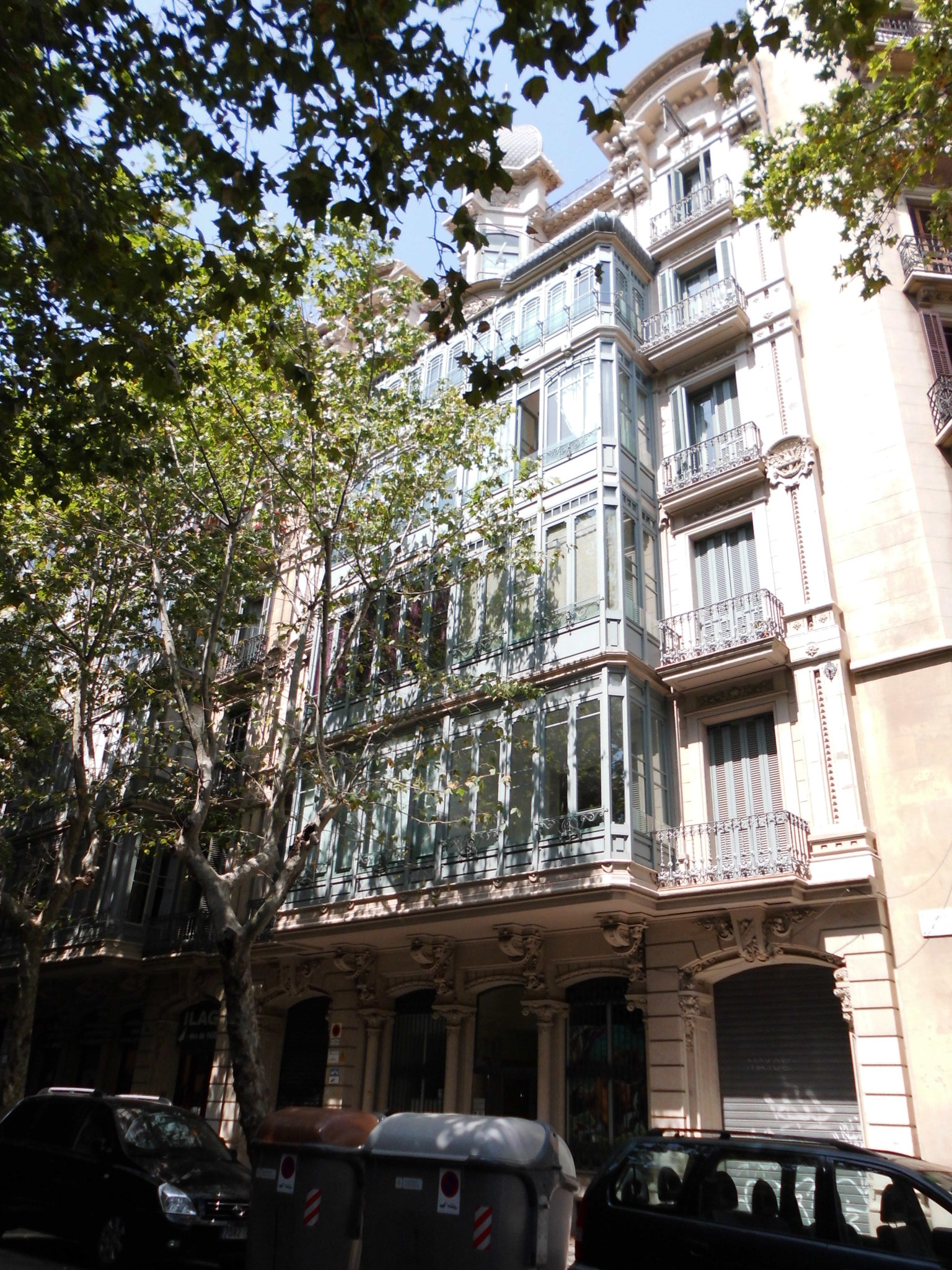
Cases Marfà.JPG

Cases Marfà are an eclectic work of Barcelona included in the Inventory of the Architectural Heritage of Catalonia.

== Description ==
The Marfà houses are located on the island of the Eixample district, bordered by the streets Ausiàs Marc, Bailén, Alí Bei, and the Passeig de Sant Joan. They have a unique exterior facade facing the Alí Bei street, where the main access to the two buildings is located, and an interior facade facing the courtyard of the island.

These are two residential buildings between medianeras, twins, commissioned by the Marfà brothers to the architect Manuel Comas and Thos and built between the years 1900 and 1902. With a rectangular floor plan, they have a raised structure that includes a basement, ground floor, five floors flat, and a roof terrace. The main accesses give way to a lobby area and to a rectangular central roof where the neighboring staircase and elevator are located.

Each building presents the façade forming an axial structure around the central tooth. The ground floor opens onto the street through five portals of dense arches. There are two large lateral portals and the other three smaller openings, framed by columns, where the capitals hold the permods of the central gallery, are presented.

The rest of the plants are structured in three vertical axes. The most important is the central one, where an elaborate rostrum occupies three of the plants and it is made of slabs on the roof terrace and the base of the tower that crowns the building. The tribunes, made of cast iron, glass enclosure and wood finishes, are finished off by a semicircular carved pediment. The lateral axes feature balconies with stone slabs, carved lintel and iron closure.

The crown of the facade is formed by the last floor, which does not have a rostrum, and the coronation elements, with rounded shapes, which include a thin tooth finished with a dome shaped like an onion covered with scales.

Access to the interior of the buildings is done through different portals. Number 27 is located on the left portal while number 29 is on the central portal. They give access to a lobby at the bottom of which is the neighboring scale that allows the distribution of horizontal properties. The hall of number 29 has been completely refurbished with current aesthetics. On the other hand, the hall of number 27 conserves the original structure and decoration, showing the walls adorned with a floral sgraffito of green and white tonalities, broken by four columns that support the false ceiling of plaster, with a border and decorative modules with vegetable motifs. At the bottom, a wooden door with glass encloses the access to the stairs.

== History ==
In 1900, two projects were presented by the architect Manuel Comas and Thos that corresponded to requests from the same owner, Emilio Marfà i Artigas, as tutor and uncle of the brothers Joaquim and Antoni Marfà i Serra. In the year 1932, deposits were installed on the roof to improve the distribution of drinking water. In 1961 a reform of the ground floor was made to be used in offices and offices, with the remodeling of partitions and the access stairs to the basement.
