= Sagrada Família (neighborhood) =

Neighborhood in Barcelona, Catalonia, Spain

Coordinates: 41°24′12.82″N 2°10′27.65″E

- Neighborhood of Barcelona
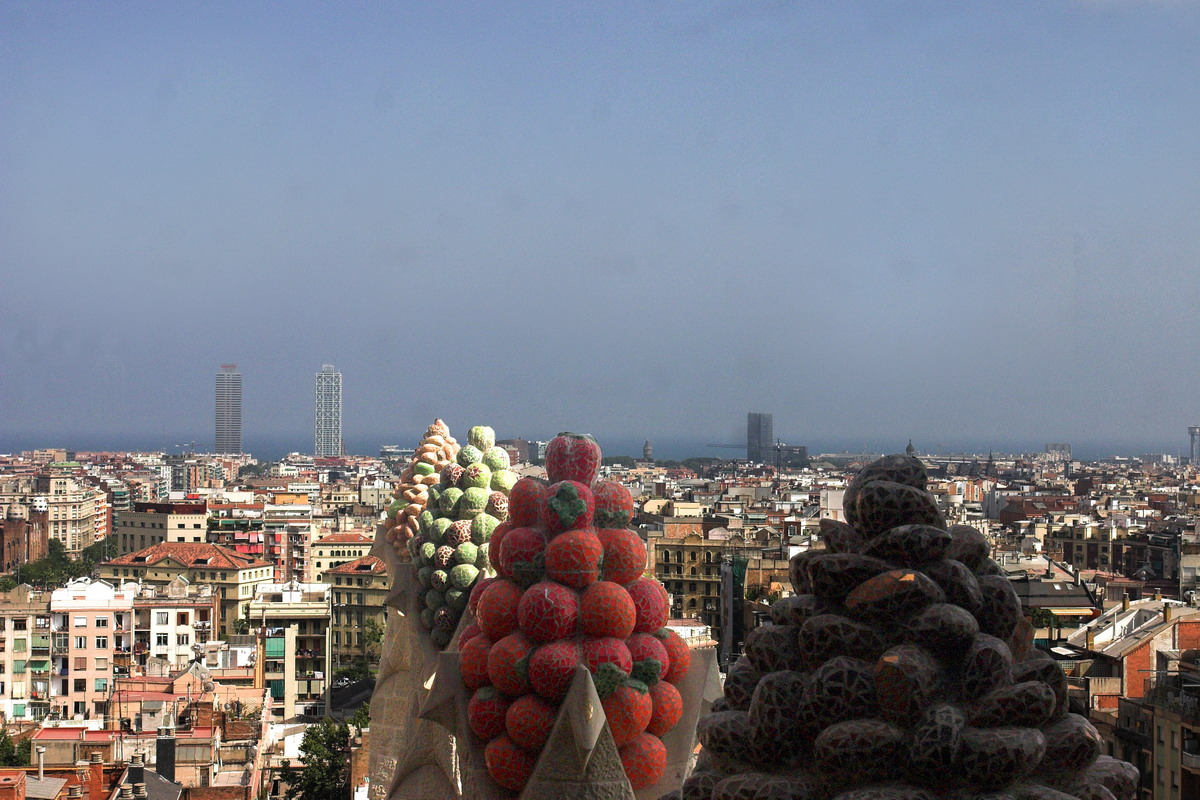
- View of the neighborhood from the Sagrada Familia towards the sea
- Interactive map of Sagrada Família
- Country: Spain
- Autonomous community: Catalonia
- Province: Barcelona
- Comarca: Barcelonès
- Municipality: Barcelona
- District: Eixample

Area
  - Total: 1.051 km^{2} (0.406 sq mi)

Population
  - Total: 51,349
  - Density: 48,860/km^{2} (126,500/sq mi)

Sagrada Família (Catalan pronunciation: [səˈɣɾaðə fəˈmiliə], Spanish pronunciation: [saˈɣɾaða fəˈmilja]) is a neighborhood in the Eixample district of Barcelona, Catalonia (Spain). Its name comes from the church of the Sagrada Família, work of Antoni Gaudí, which can be found in the center of the neighborhood.
