= La Nova Esquerra de l'Eixample =

Coordinates: 41°23′0.2″N 2°8′56.4″E

- Neighborhood of Barcelona
- Interactive map of La Nova Esquerra de l'Eixample
- Country: Spain
- Autonomous community: Catalonia
- Province: Barcelona
- Comarca: Barcelonès
- Municipality: Barcelona
- District: Eixample

Area
  - Total: 1.338 km^{2} (0.517 sq mi)

Population
  - Total: 57,676
  - Density: 43,110/km^{2} (111,600/sq mi)

La Nova Esquerra de l'Eixample (Catalan for Expansion, New Left, meaning the newer sector of L'Eixample ['the Expansion'] on the west/left side of Carrer de Balmes) is a neighborhood in the Eixample district of Barcelona, Catalonia (Spain). Originally it formed a single unit, called Esquerra de l'Eixample, with the current neighborhood l'Antiga Esquerra de l'Eixample.

In this neighborhood there are the Can Batlló's three buildings (currently the Industrial School), the former prison La Model, the park Parc de Joan Miró, located in the emplacement of the former city's slaughterhouse, the bullfighting ring Las Arenas, which is nowadays a shopping centre, and the Casa Golferichs.

Due to its considerable Romanian migrant population, La Nova Esquerra de l'Eixample has been defined as a "Little Romania".

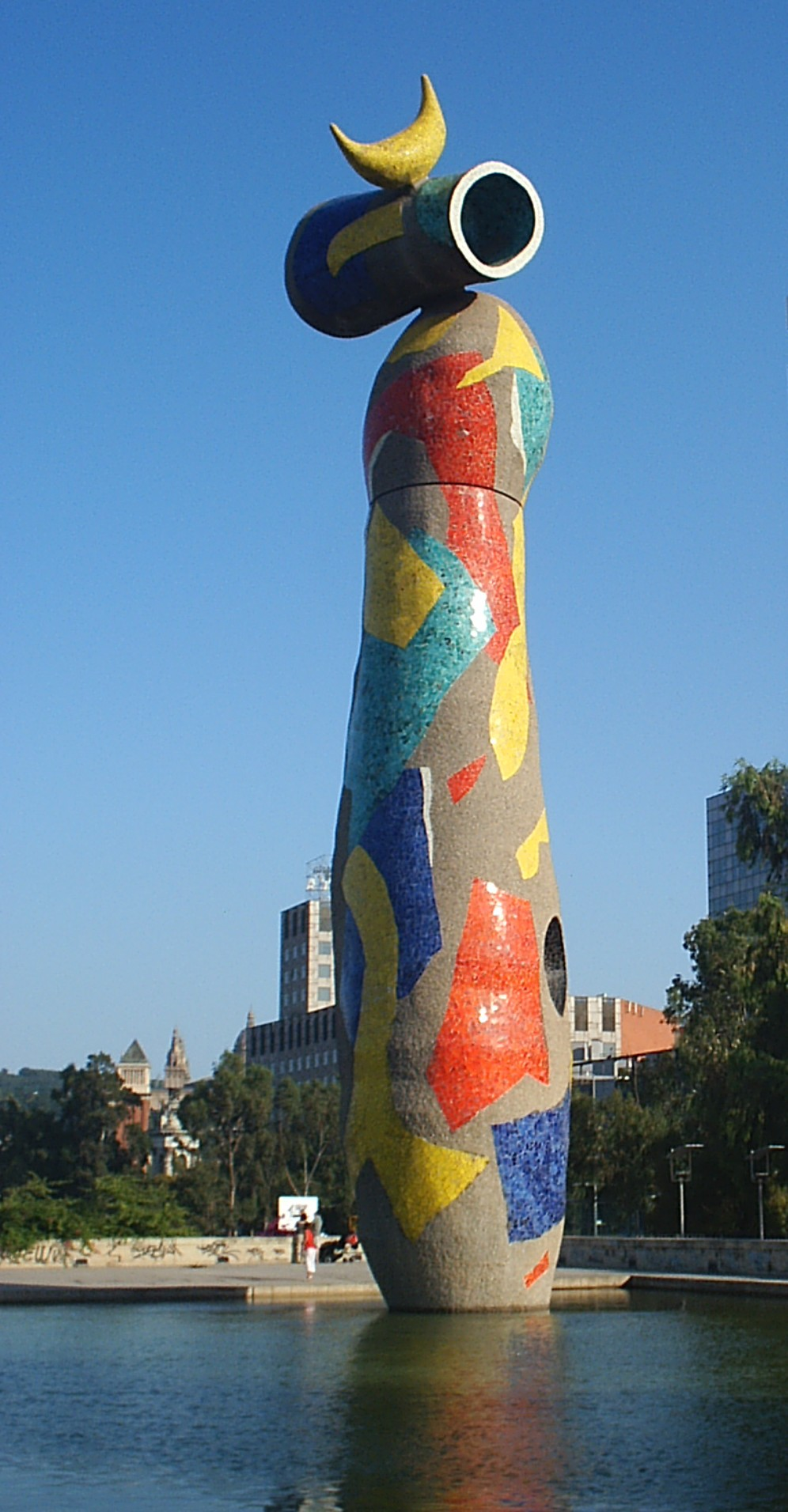
Sculpture Dona i Ocell at the Parc de Joan Miró

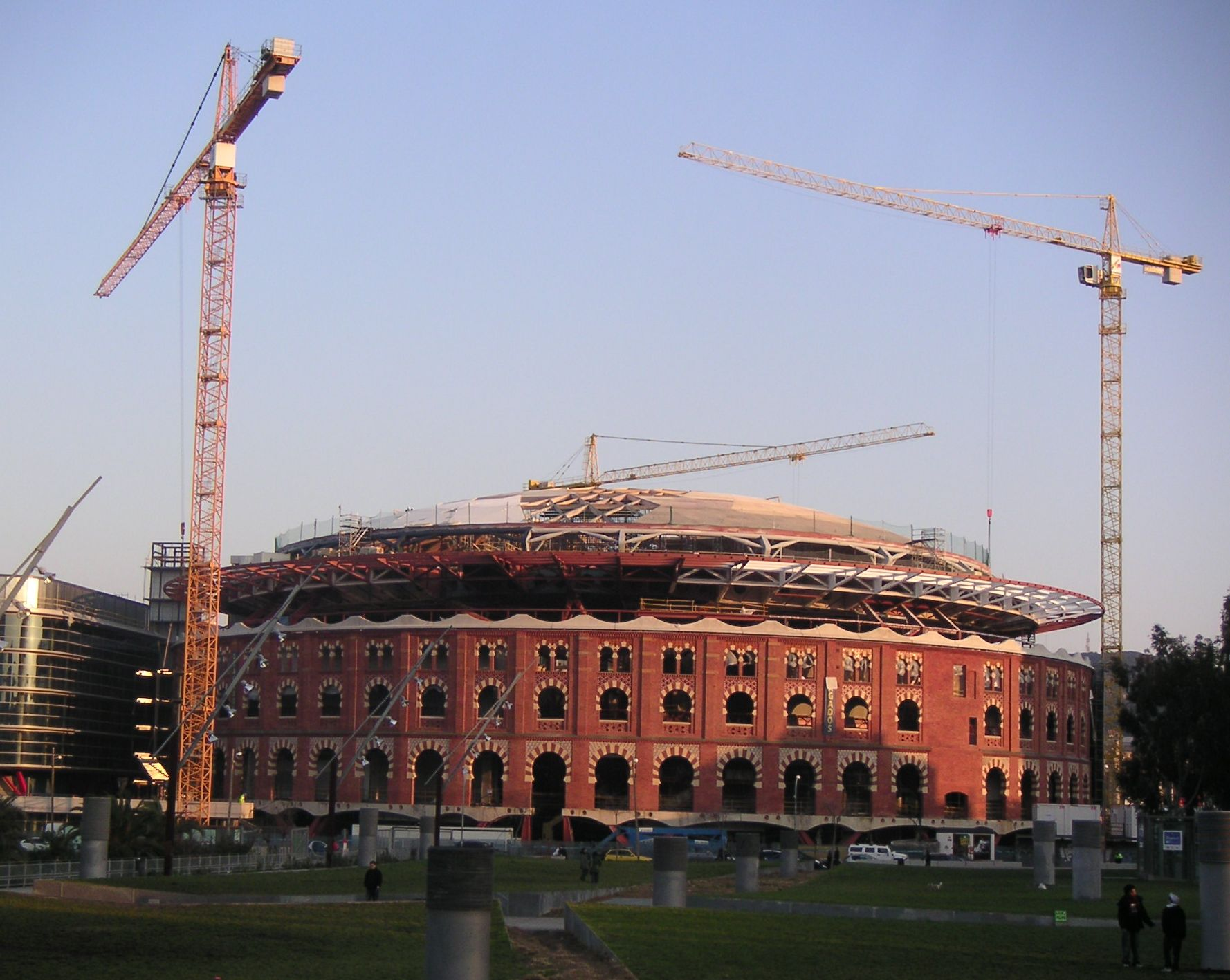
Les Arenes During its remodelation (2010)

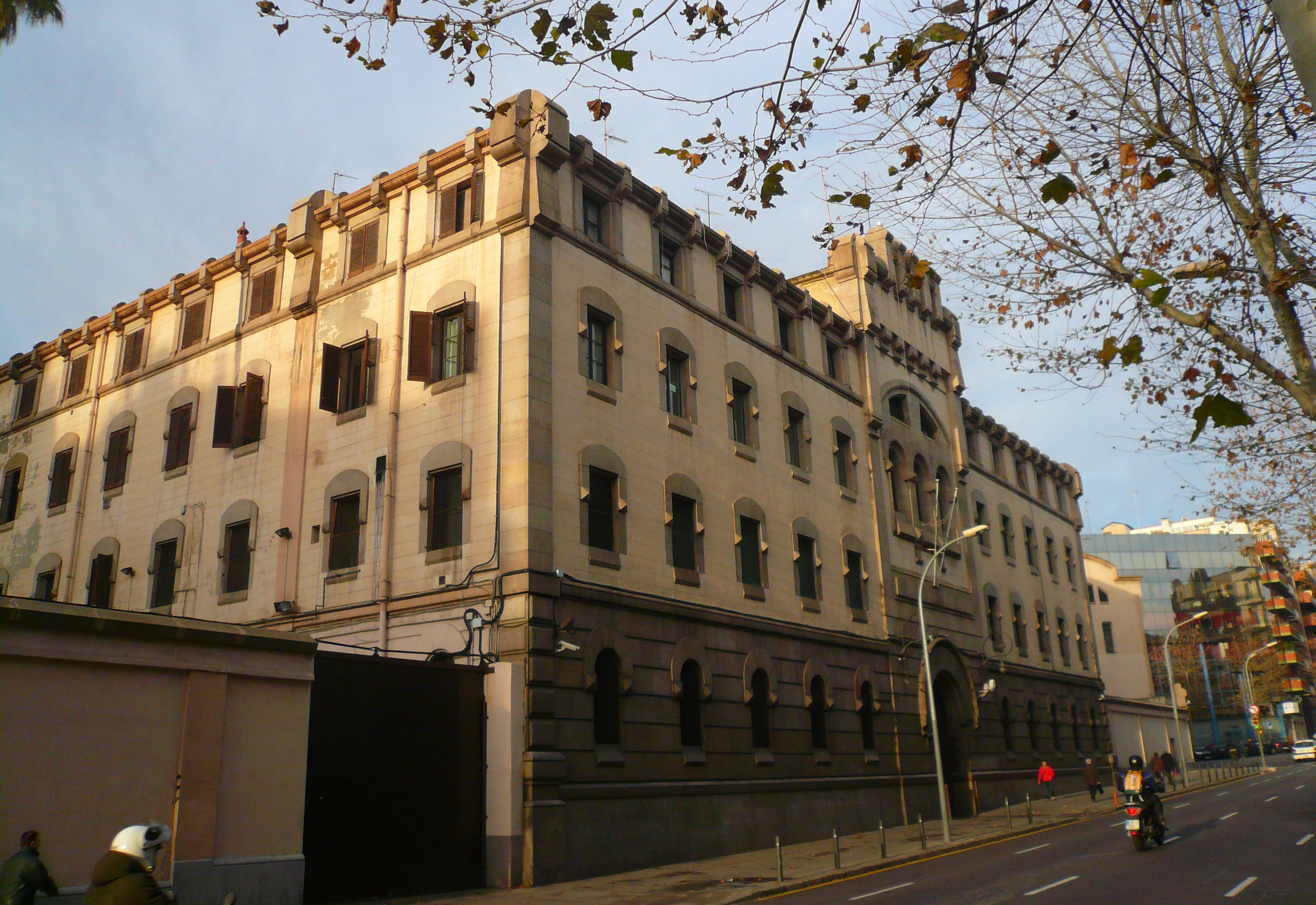
Model prison of Barcelona

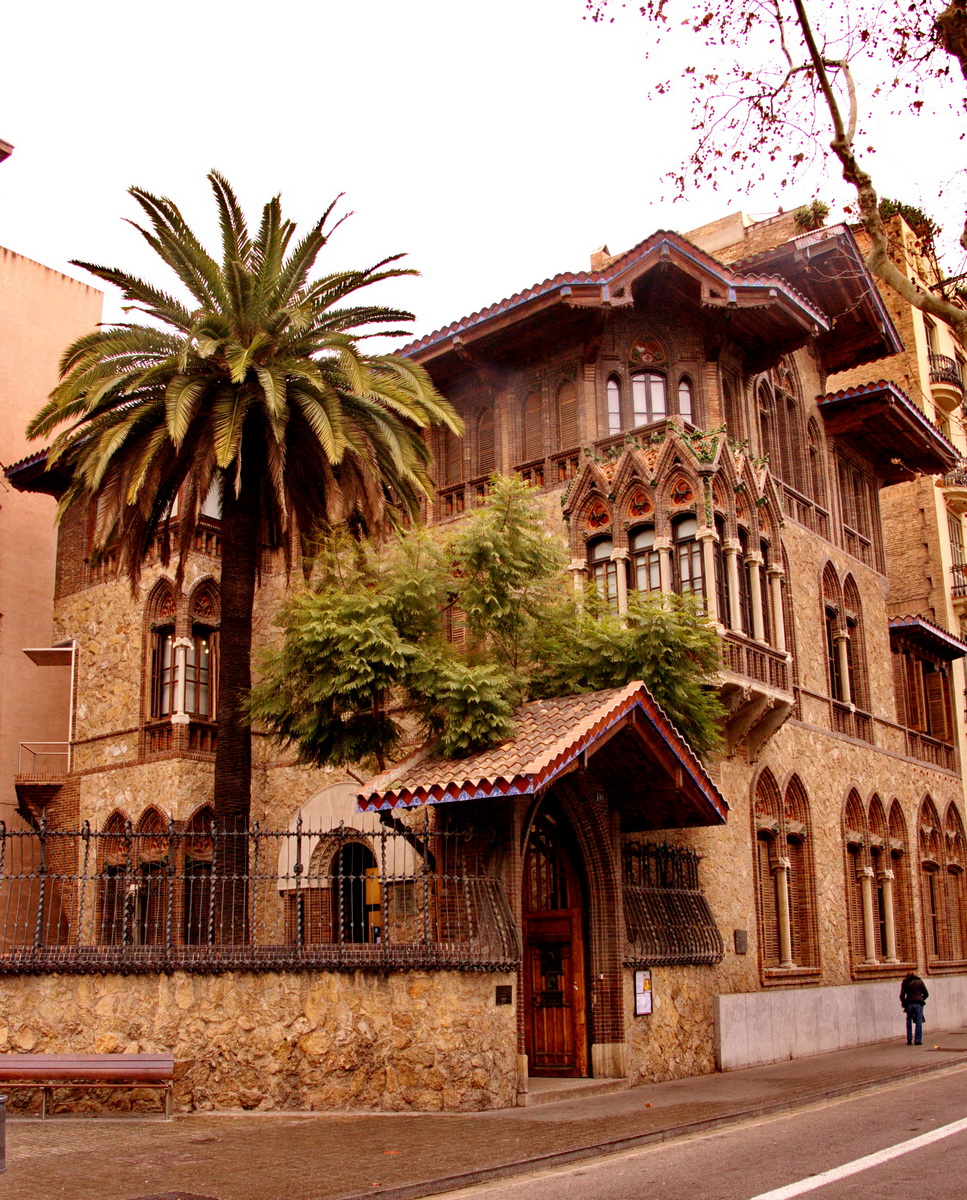
Casa Golferichs
