= Social Defence Committee =

Social Defence Committee Comité de Defensa Social
- Founded: 1903
- Dissolved: 1923
- Ideology: Conservatism; Catholicism
- Political position: Right-wing

The Social Defence Committee (Spanish: Comité de Defensa Social, CDS) was a Spanish conservative Catholic organization founded in Barcelona in 1903.

== Bibliography ==
- Andrés-Gallego, José; Pazos, Antón M. (1999). La Iglesia en la España contemporánea/1: 1800-1936 (in Spanish). Ediciones Encuentro. ISBN 8474905192.
- Moliner Prada, Antonio (2011). "Clericalismo y anticlericalismo en la España contemporánea". História: Questões & Debates (in Spanish) (55). Curitiba: Associação Paranaense de História y Universidade Federal do Paraná: 59–82. ISSN 0100-6932.
