= Republican Nationalist Federal Union =

Republican Nationalist Federal Union Unión Federal Nacionalista Republicana Unió Federal Nacionalista Republicana
- President: José María Vallés y Ribot
- Founded: 1910
- Dissolved: 1917
- Merger of: Republican Union (in Catalonia); Federal Democratic Republican Party; Republican Nationalist Centre
- Preceded by: Catalan Solidarity
- Headquarters: Barcelona
- Ideology: Republicanism; Catalanism; Social liberalism Federalism; Federal republicanism
- Political position: Centre-left
- Colours: Red, Yellow and Murrey

The Republican Nationalist Federal Union (Spanish: Unión Federal Nacionalista Republicana, Catalan: Unió Federal Nacionalista Republicana. UFNR) was a left-republican political party formed in 1910 in Catalonia by the Republican Nationalist Centre and republican elements from the late Catalan Solidarity.

In 1914, UFNR signed a deal with the Radical Republican Party (PRR), the "Pact of San Gervasio", seeking to challenge the political hegemony of Regionalist League in Barcelona, but the alliance's poor results led to its disestablishment in 1917.

== Bibliography ==
- Townson, Nigel (2000). The Crisis of Democracy in Spain: Centrist Politics Under the Second Republic, 1931-1936. Brighton [u.a.]: Sussex Academic Press. ISBN 9781898723196.
- Serrano Lahoz, Manuel (2020). Los partidos republicanos durante la Restauración (1874-1931) (PDF) (BA thesis) (in Spanish). University of Zaragoza.
