= Horta, Barcelona =

Coordinates: 41°25′46.21″N 2°9′36.36″E

Horta
- Neighborhood of Barcelona
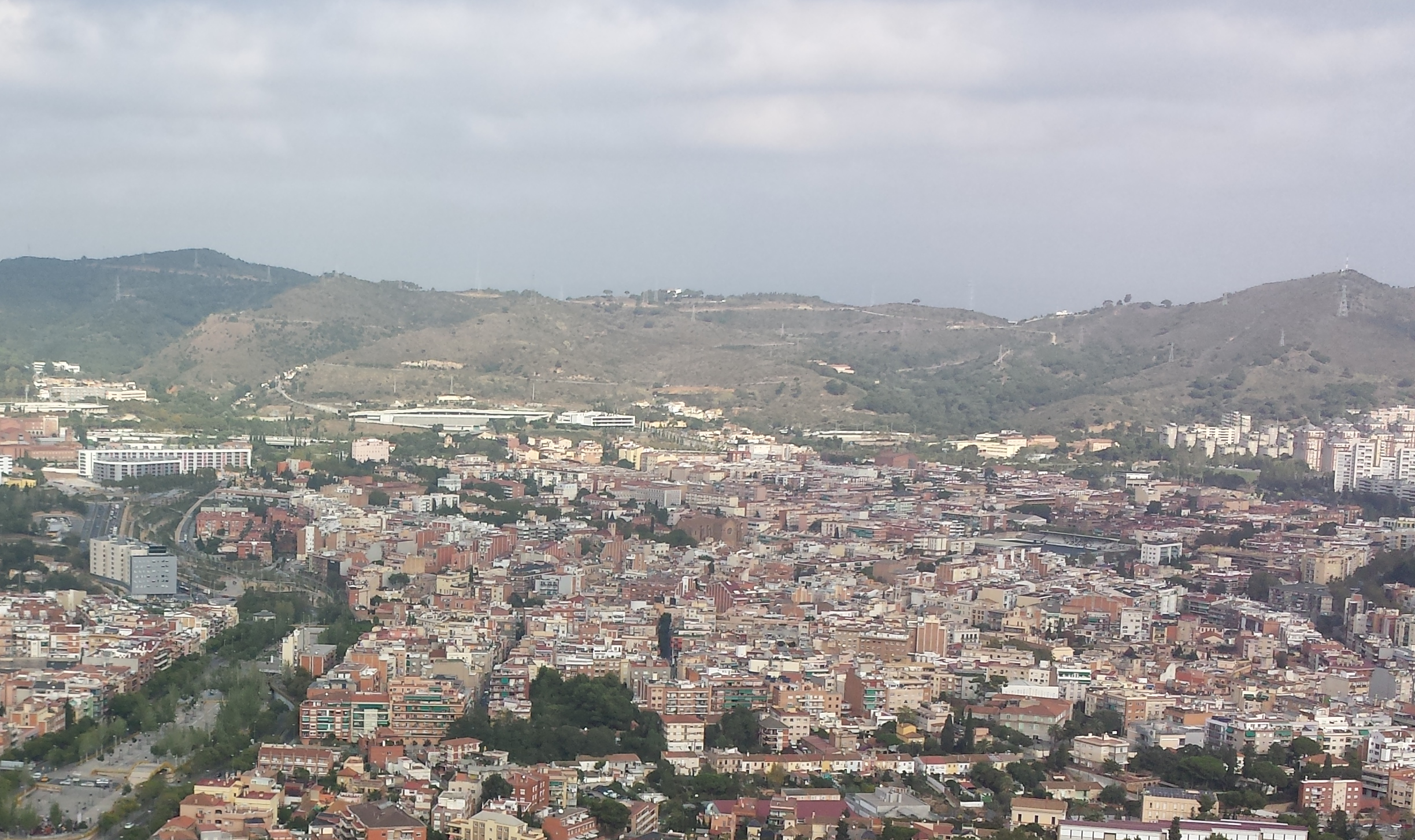
- Horta as seen from the Turó de la Rovira
- Interactive map of Horta
- Country: Spain
- Autonomous community: Catalonia
- Province: Barcelona
- Comarca: Barcelonès
- Municipality: Barcelona
- District: Horta-Guinardó

Area
  - Total: 3.082 km^{2} (1.190 sq mi)

Population
  - Total: 26,597
  - Density: 8,630/km^{2} (22,350/sq mi)
- Demonym(s): hortenc, -a

Horta (Catalan pronunciation: [ˈɔɾtə], Spanish: [ˈoɾta]) is a neighborhood in the Horta-Guinardó district of Barcelona, Catalonia (Spain). It is documented for the first time in 965, in which appears as the valley of Horta. Originally the neighborhood was the main town of the former municipality of Horta which had very similar boundaries to the current Horta-Guinardó district. Horta is well known in Catalonia for its 1 January New Year celebrations as it is the only district in Spain where the first day of the year is celebrated with outdoor meals and drinks.
