= Sants =

Human settlement in Barcelona, Spain

Coordinates: 41°22′31″N 2°08′10″E

- Neighborhood of Barcelona
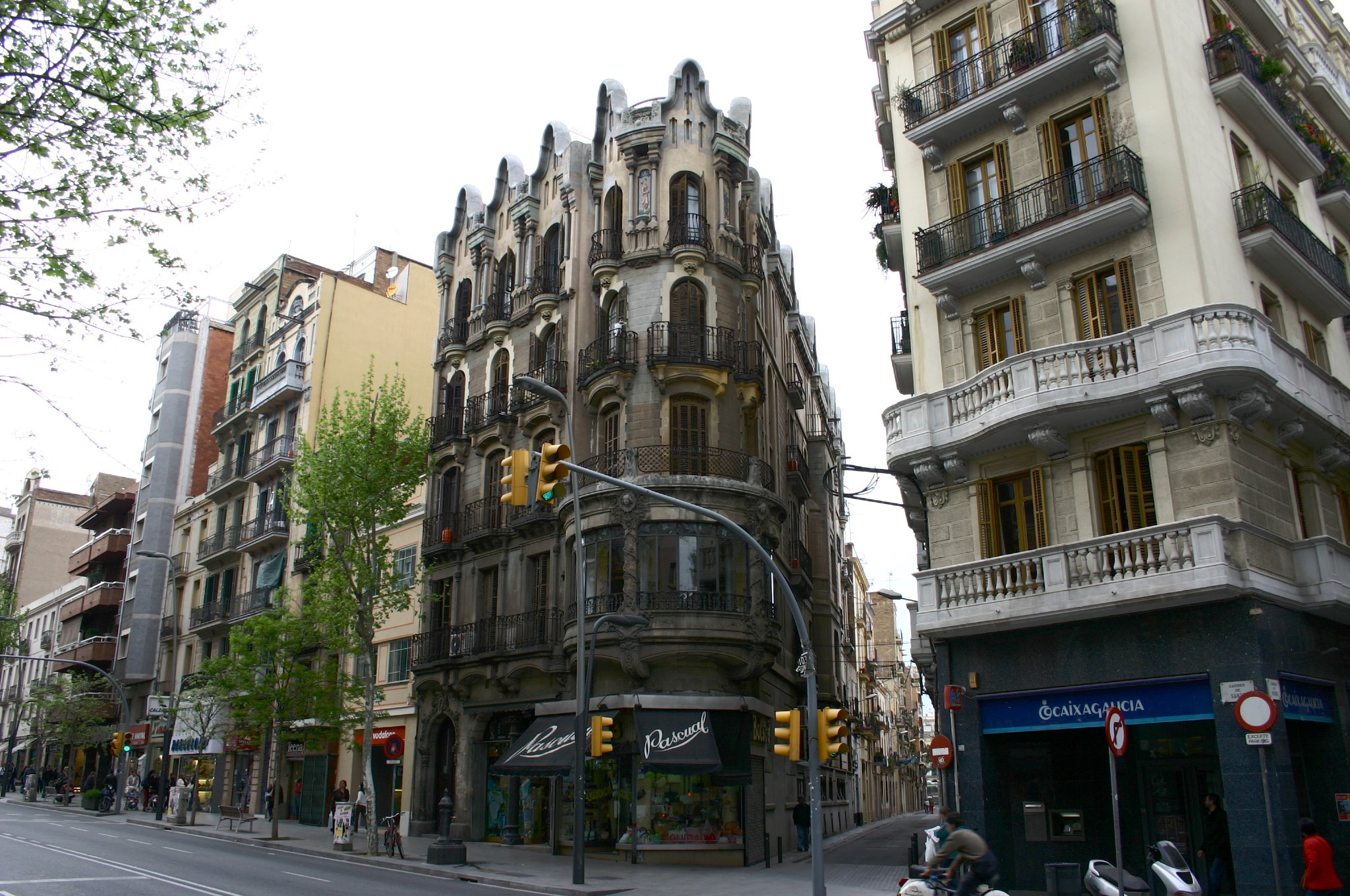
- Casa Jaume Estrada (1906) on the neighbourhood's main artery, Carrer de Sants
- Interactive map of Sants
- Country: Spain
- Autonomous community: Catalonia
- Province: Barcelona
- Comarca: Barcelonès
- Municipality: Barcelona
- District: Sants-Montjuïc

Area
  - Total: 1.098 km^{2} (0.424 sq mi)

Population
  - Total: 40,831
  - Density: 37,190/km^{2} (96,310/sq mi)
- Demonym(s): santsenc, -a

Sants (Catalan pronunciation: [sans]) is a neighbourhood in the southern part of Barcelona. It belongs to the district of Sants-Montjuïc and is bordered by the districts of Eixample to the northeast, Les Corts to the northwest, and by the municipality of l'Hospitalet de Llobregat to the south. Although old-fashioned, its name is sometimes still written as Sans in some Spanish-language sources.

The main artery of the neighbourhood is Carrer de Sants, popularly known as Carretera de Sants, which runs westwards from Plaça Espanya to the neighbouring municipality of L'Hospitalet de Llobregat. It is one of the largest commercial streets in Barcelona.

Barcelona Sants railway station, the major railway station in Barcelona, and the Parc de l'Espanya Industrial are both located in Sants.

== History ==
Sants was the core of an industrial town known as Santa Maria de Sants on the plain bordering Barcelona. In the spring of 1883, the municipalities of Sants and Barcelona decided by mutual agreement to merge the two respective municipalities. One year later, the central government annulled the merger due to technical issues. The process was again put in motion the following year when Barcelona's city government sent a request for aggregation to the Diputació Provincial de Barcelona, but this request was not fulfilled for more than two years. In March 1889, the Civil Government asked the Deputation to resolve the issue. A commission presided by Rius i Taulet traveled to Madrid to help move along the case. However, once more, the Deputation took no action.

The merger with Barcelona finally took effect in 1897. By then, Sants had a population of 19,105 inhabitants, and the neighbourhood had a strong industrial character, home to some of the most important manufacturers of Spanish textiles, such as España Industrial and Vapor Vell.

In 2014 rioting broke out in Sants and spread to Barcelona and other cities, when local authorities attempted to demolish the Can Vies community center, a building which had been squatted since 1997.

== Feasts ==
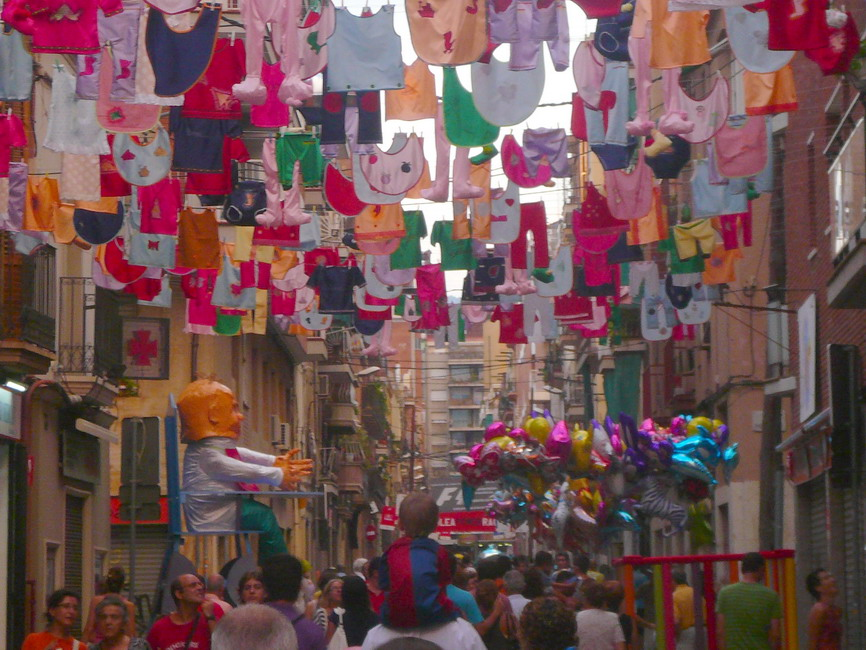
Carrer d'Alcoleo in Sants decorated for Festa Major in 2008

The most famous feast is the Festa Major, which is celebrated yearly in honor of the patron saint, Bartholomew the Apostle. During the week-long feast, the traffic is cut off in several parts of the neighborhood, where multiple popular activities are organized outdoors, such as butifarrades, xocolatades (gatherings where people drink chocolate), concerts, sardanes, and habaneres. The neighbors decorate the streets with allegorical themes. Another feast, the Festa Alternativa, is celebrated simultaneously with great success.

== Inhabitants ==
The singer and actress Núria Feliu and the tenor Josep Carreras were both born in Sants.
