= Dreta de l'Eixample =

Neighborhood in Barcelona, Catalonia, Spain

Coordinates: 41°23′43″N 2°10′0″E

- Neighborhood of Barcelona
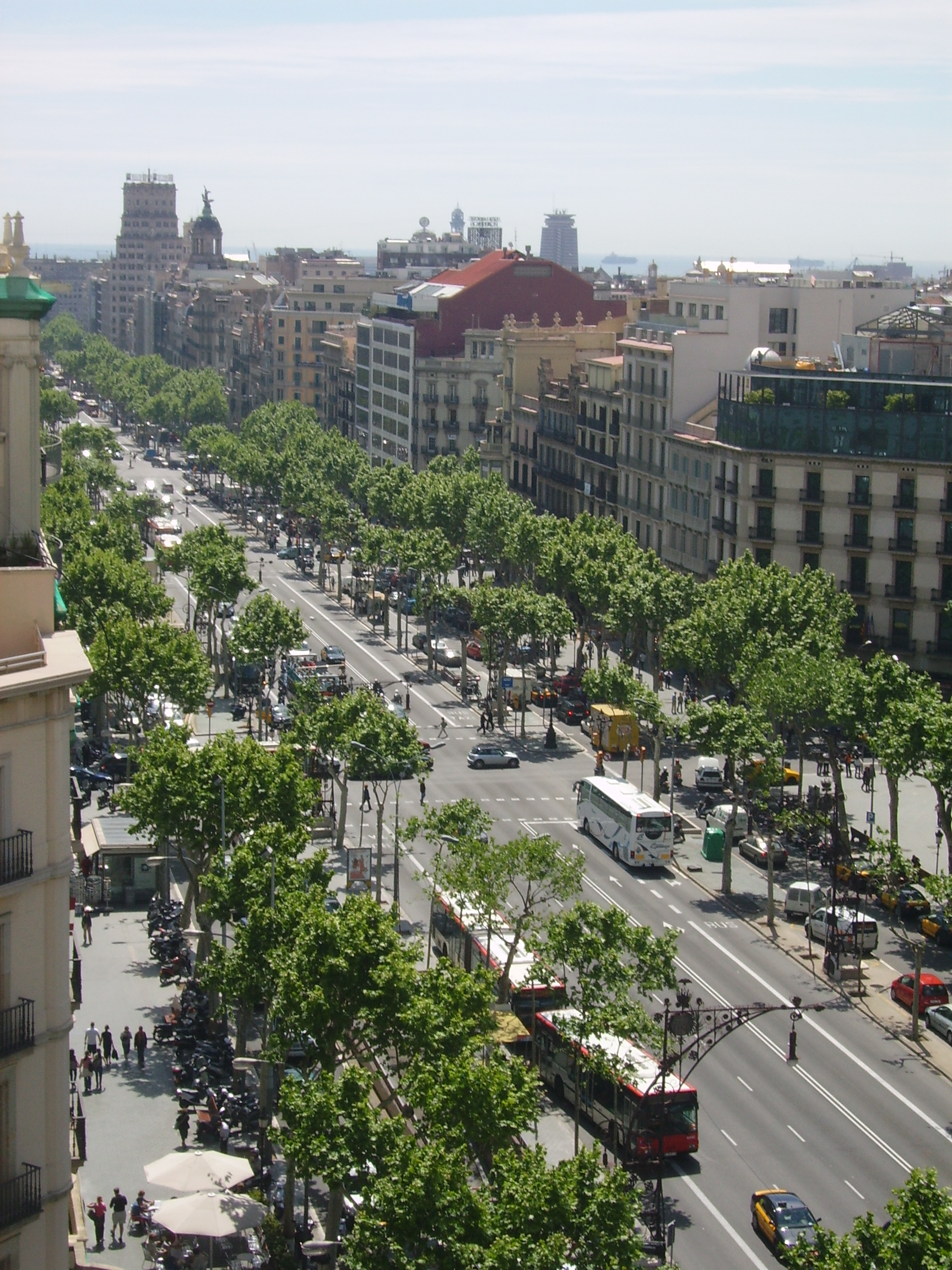
- Passeig de Gràcia, a street of the neighborhood
- Interactive map of Dreta de l'Eixample
- Country: Spain
- Autonomous community: Catalonia
- Province: Barcelona
- Comarca: Barcelonès
- Municipality: Barcelona
- District: Eixample

Area
  - Total: 2.123 km^{2} (0.820 sq mi)

Population
  - Total: 43,715
  - Density: 20,590/km^{2} (53,330/sq mi)

Dreta de l'Eixample (Catalan pronunciation: [ˈdɾɛtə ðə ləˈʃamplə]) is a neighborhood in the Eixample district of Barcelona, Catalonia (Spain). It is located to the east (visualised as dreta or "right") of Carrer de Balmes. The neighborhood includes Plaça de Catalunya, the city center, as well as the upscale streets Rambla de Catalunya and Passeig de Gràcia. Known as the bourgeois area of the city, it is home to a majority of Barcelona upper class. Dreta de L'Eixample is one of the most luxurious neighborhoods in Barcelona.
