= El Poble-sec, Barcelona =

Coordinates: 41°22′25″N 2°9′48″E

El Poble-sec
- Neighborhood of Barcelona
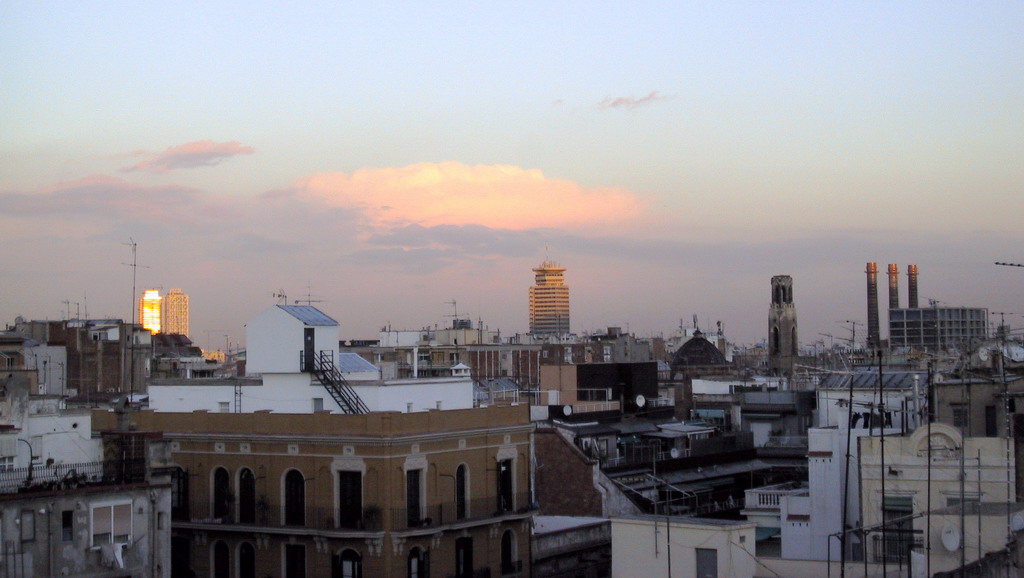
- El Poble-sec

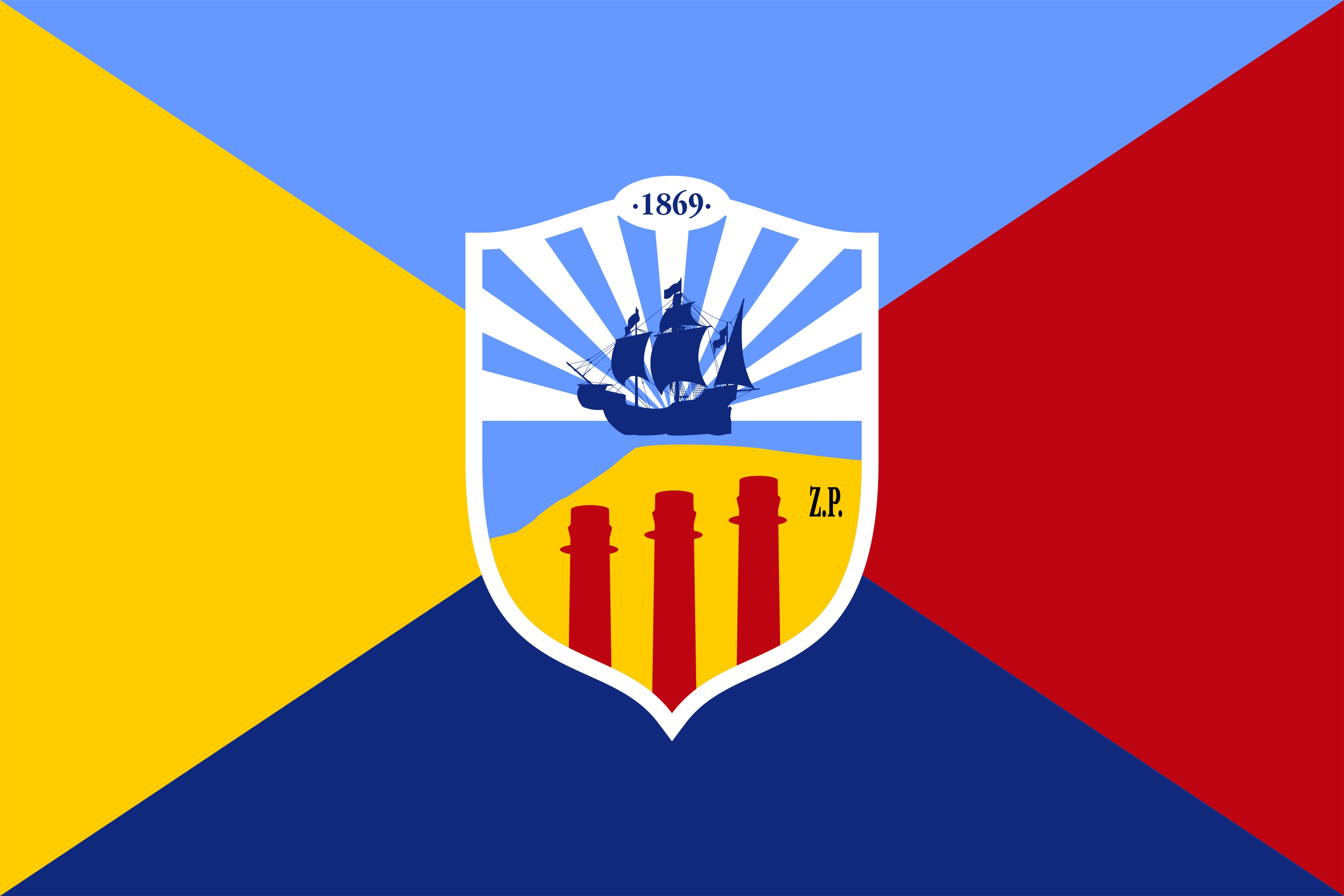
- Flag
- Interactive map of El Poble-sec
- Country: Spain
- Autonomous community: Catalonia
- Province: Barcelona
- Comarca: Barcelonès
- Municipality: Barcelona
- District: Sants-Montjuïc

Area
  - Total: 4.605 km^{2} (1.778 sq mi)

Population
  - Total: 40,104
  - Density: 8,709/km^{2} (22,560/sq mi)
- Demonym(s): poble-sequí, -ina poble-sequenc, -a

El Poble-sec (pronounced [əl ˌpɔbːləˈsɛk]; Catalan for 'The Dry Village') is a neighborhood in the Sants-Montjuïc district of Barcelona, Catalonia (Spain). The neighborhood is located between Montjuïc mountain and the Avinguda del Paral·lel. It covers around 70 hectares.

The Poble Sec station of the Barcelona Metro is located in, and named after, this neighborhood. It had an estimated population at the beginning of 2020 of 40,139 inhabitants.

== District development ==
The area began its official development in the 19th century, evolving each decade with changes in its population, cuisine, entertainment, and culture. The neighborhood now showcases a blend of old and new on every corner.

Before the late 1800s, the city was confined by walls, resulting in overcrowding, unsanitary conditions, and harsh working environments. This led people to move outside the walls of Barcelona to what is now known as Poble Sec. Remnants of the medieval city wall can still be seen today at the end of Avinguda del Paraŀlel, next to the Museu Marítim de Barcelona.
