= L'Antiga Esquerra de l'Eixample =

- Neighborhood
- Interactive map of L'Antiga Esquerra de l'Eixample
- Country: Spain
- Autonomous community: Catalonia
- Province: Barcelona
- Comarca: Barcelonès
- Municipality: Barcelona
- District: Eixample

Area
  - Total: 1.234 km^{2} (0.476 sq mi)

Population
  - Total: 41,872
  - Density: 33,930/km^{2} (87,880/sq mi)
- Website: Official website

L'Antiga Esquerra de l'Eixample (Catalan: [lənˈtiɣə əsˈkɛrə ðə ləˈʃamplə]; "the Old Left of the Eixample") is a neighborhood in the Eixample district of Barcelona, Catalonia (Spain). As of 2016, it had a population of 41,854.

The present-day neighborhoods of L'Antiga Esquerra de l'Eixample and La Nova Esquerra de l'Eixample formed a single neighborhood (l'Esquerra de l'Eixample) until 2006, when it was administratively divided into two neighborhoods.

== History ==
The Catalan word eixample ("expansion") refers to the 19th-century expansion of the city of Barcelona beyond its old walls. The Cerdà Plan, approved in 1859, laid out this expansion between the old city and the village of Gràcia. The term Esquerra ("left") denotes the western side of the Eixample, while Antiga ("old") distinguishes it from La Nova Esquerra de l'Eixample ("new").
