= Sant Andreu =

District of Barcelona, Catalonia

Coordinates: 41°26′10″N 2°11′28″E

- District
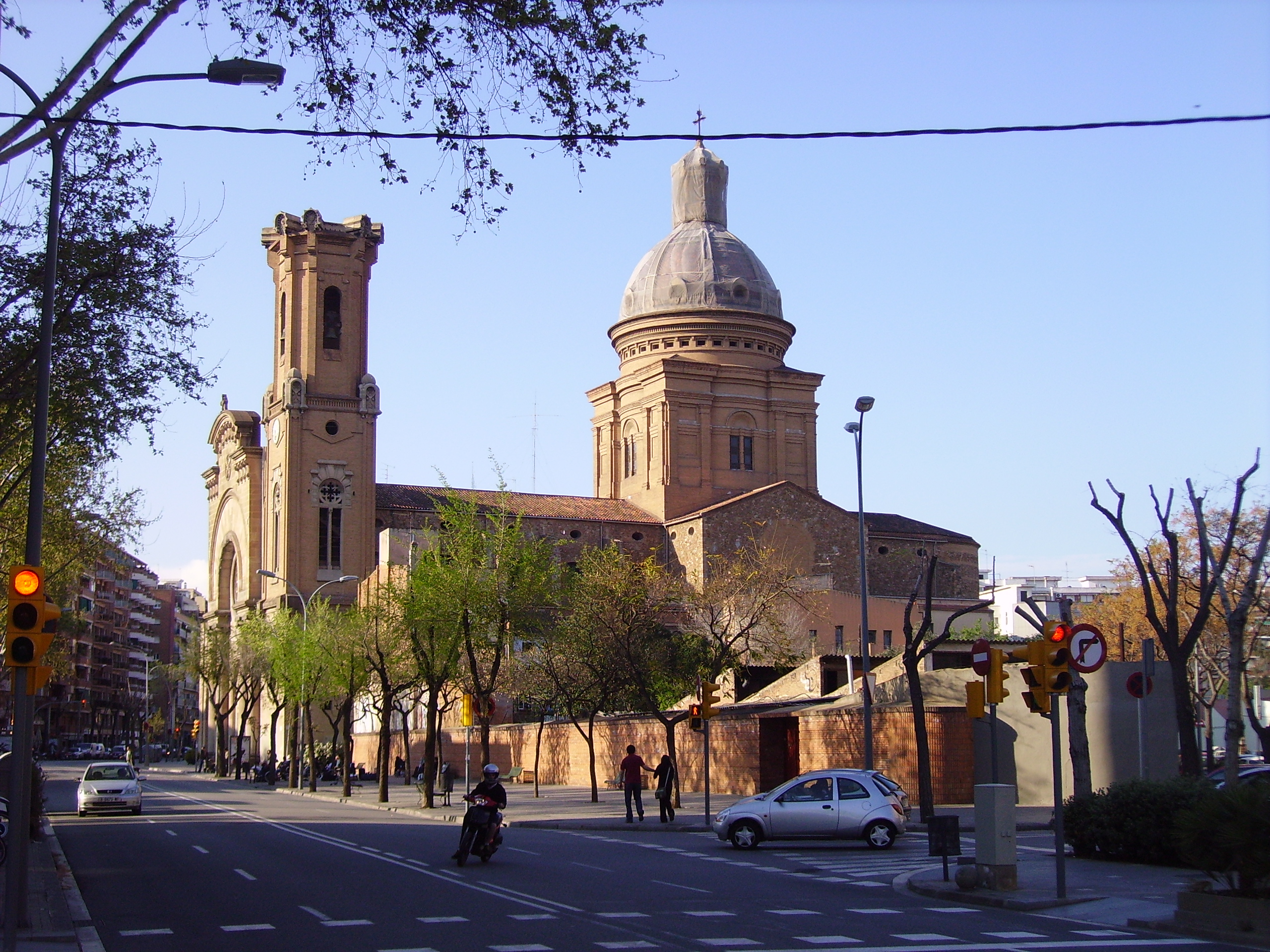
- Church of Sant Andreu de Palomar, the center of the district

- Districts of Barcelona, Sant Andreu coloured red
- Interactive map of Sant Andreu
- Country: Spain
- Autonomous community: Catalonia
- Province: Barcelona
- Comarca: Barcelonès
- Municipality: Barcelona

Area
  - Total: 6.53 km^{2} (2.52 sq mi)

Map of the district, with its different neighbourhoods

Sant Andreu (Catalan pronunciation: [ˌsant ənˈdɾew], in spanish: San Andrés) is one of the ten districts of Barcelona since its redistricting in 1984. It was named after the former municipality of Sant Andreu de Palomar, which was the largest in the area and now makes up the bulk of the neighbourhood bearing its name, as well as part of the neighboring district of Nou Barris.

Its size is 653 ha. (third district in size) and it had 142,598 inhabitants in 2005. It is in the northern part of the city, bordering the river Besòs, two adjacent towns in the metropolitan area, Sant Adrià de Besòs and Santa Coloma de Gramenet, and three other districts of Barcelona: Nou Barris, Horta-Guinardó and Sant Martí.

== Neighborhoods ==
It is further divided into seven neighborhoods:

- Sant Andreu de Palomar
- La Sagrera
- Trinitat Vella
- Baró de Viver
- Navas (renamed "Torrent de la Guineu", pending approval)
- El Congrés i els Indians
- Bon Pastor

== See also ==
- Sant Andreu Arenal railway station
- Sant Andreu Comtal railway station
- Bac de Roda Bridge
- Casa Bloc
- UE Sant Andreu (football club)
- Street names in Barcelona
- Urban planning of Barcelona
