= Regionalist League of Catalonia =

Regionalist League of Catalonia Lliga Regionalista de Catalunya
- Leader: Francesc Cambó
- Founded: 1901
- Dissolved: 1936
- Headquarters: Barcelona
- Newspaper: La Veu de Catalunya
- Ideology: Catalanism; Conservatism; Liberalism; Christian democracy Monarchism (until 1931)

Regionalist League of Catalonia (Catalan: Lliga Regionalista de Catalunya, IPA: [ˈʎiɣə rəʒi.unəˈlistə ðə kətəˈluɲə]; 1901–1936) was a right wing political party of Catalonia, Spain. It had a Catalanist, conservative, and monarchic ideology. Notable members of the party were Enric Prat de la Riba, Francesc Cambó, Agustí Riera i Pau, Joan Ventosa and Ramon d'Abadal i Calderó.

The League's press organ was the La Veu de Catalunya newspaper (1899–1936).

== History ==
The Regionalist League began with the merger of two political groups, the Unió Regionalista and the Centre Nacional Català (a breakaway group from the Unió Catalanista), thanks to the triumph of the "four presidents" candidacy in 1901. This candidacy was formed by Sebastià Torres, Albert Rusiñol, Bartomeu Robert and Lluís Domènech i Montaner. Between 1901 and 1923, with few exceptions, it was the dominant catalanist political party. In 1914, it gained the creation of the first common administration of Catalonia since 1833, the Commonwealth of Catalonia (Mancomunitat de Catalunya), led by Enric Prat de la Riba and Josep Puig i Cadafalch, both from the Lliga.

After the Republic was established in 1931, and despite the loss of its hegemony to the new left-wing nationalist party Republican Left of Catalonia (ERC), the Lliga accepted the new government, supported the first Statute of Autonomy of Catalonia and changed its name to Lliga Catalana (Catalan League). After the restoration of the Catalan Government in 1936, the Lliga moved to more centrist positions, abandoning many of the parliamentary rhetoric against the Catalan left and accepting the Republic as the form of government of Spain.

Although the Lliga did not support the rebellion of general Francisco Franco in Morocco in 1936, many of its activists collaborated with Franco's cause. It was dissolved during the confusion of the Spanish Civil War.

Francesc Cambó and the leading members of the Lliga Catalana (formerly the Liga Regionalista) collaborated with the rebels during the war. Their pro-Franco activities were carried out mainly in France and Italy.

== Election results ==
Election	Seats	+/-
1901	6 / 45	New
1903	4 / 45	▼2
1905	7 / 45	▲3
1907	13 / 45	▲6
1910	8 / 45	▼5
1914	13 / 45	▲5
1916	13 / 45	No change
1918	22 / 45	▲9
1919	14 / 45	▼8
1920	17 / 45	▲3
1923	22 / 45	▲5
1931	2 / 53	▼20
1933	24 / 54	▲22
1936	12 / 54	▼12

== See also ==
- Category:Regionalist League of Catalonia politicians
- ¡Cu-Cut!
- Agustí Riera i Pau
