= Josep Massanès i Mestres =

Spanish military engineer (1777–1857)

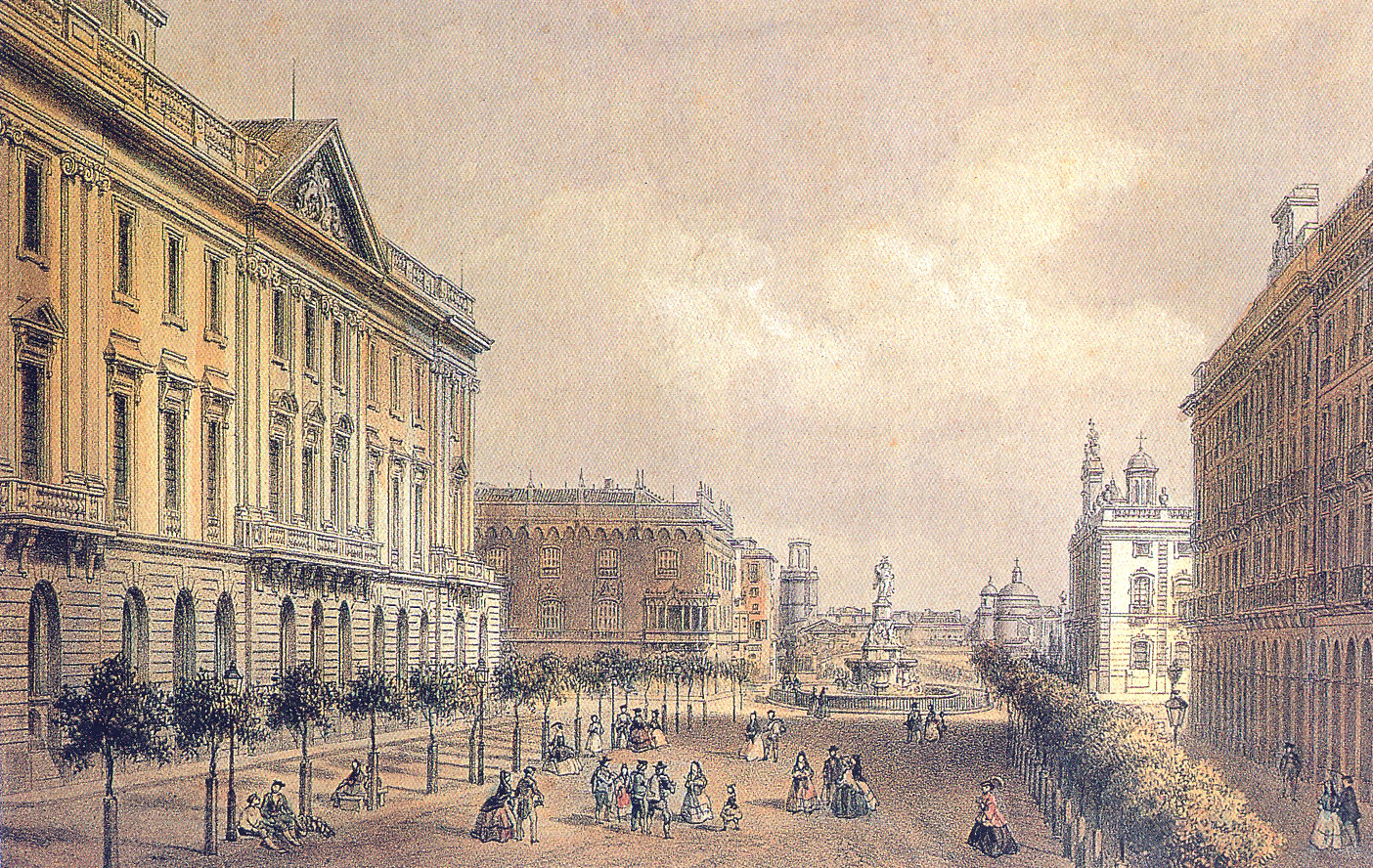
- Project for the redevelopment of Pla de Palau (1844-1848). Lithograph by Isidore Laurent Deroy.
- Born: 1777; Barcelona, Spain
- Died: 1857 (aged 79–80); Barcelona, Spain
- Education: Escuela de la Lonja
- Occupations: Architect, Engineer, Military science
- Notable work: Portal de Mar (1844-1848)
- Movement: Royal Academy of Fine Arts of San Fernando
- Children: María Josefa Massanés

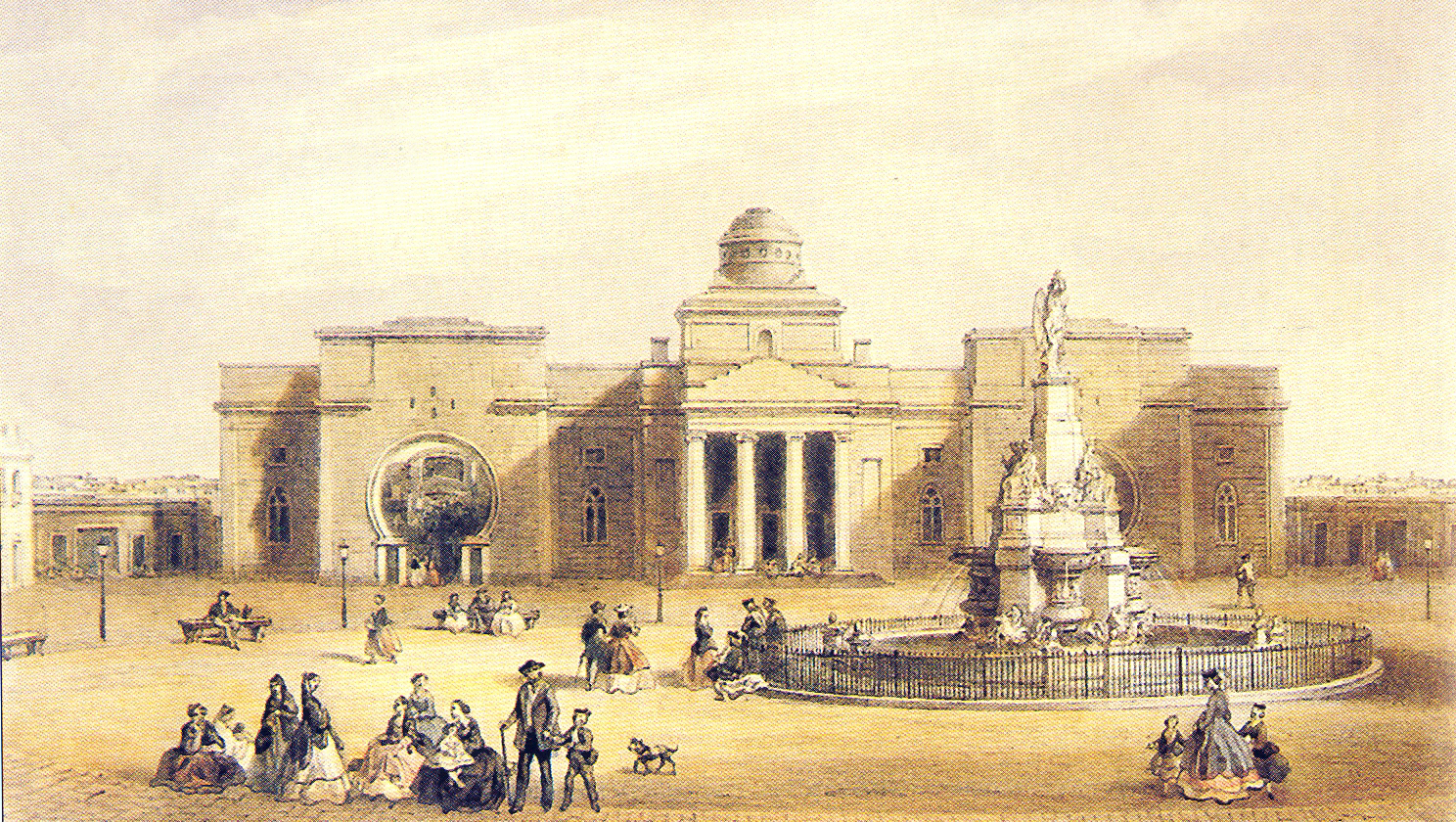
Portal de Mar, lithograph by Isidore Laurent Deroy.

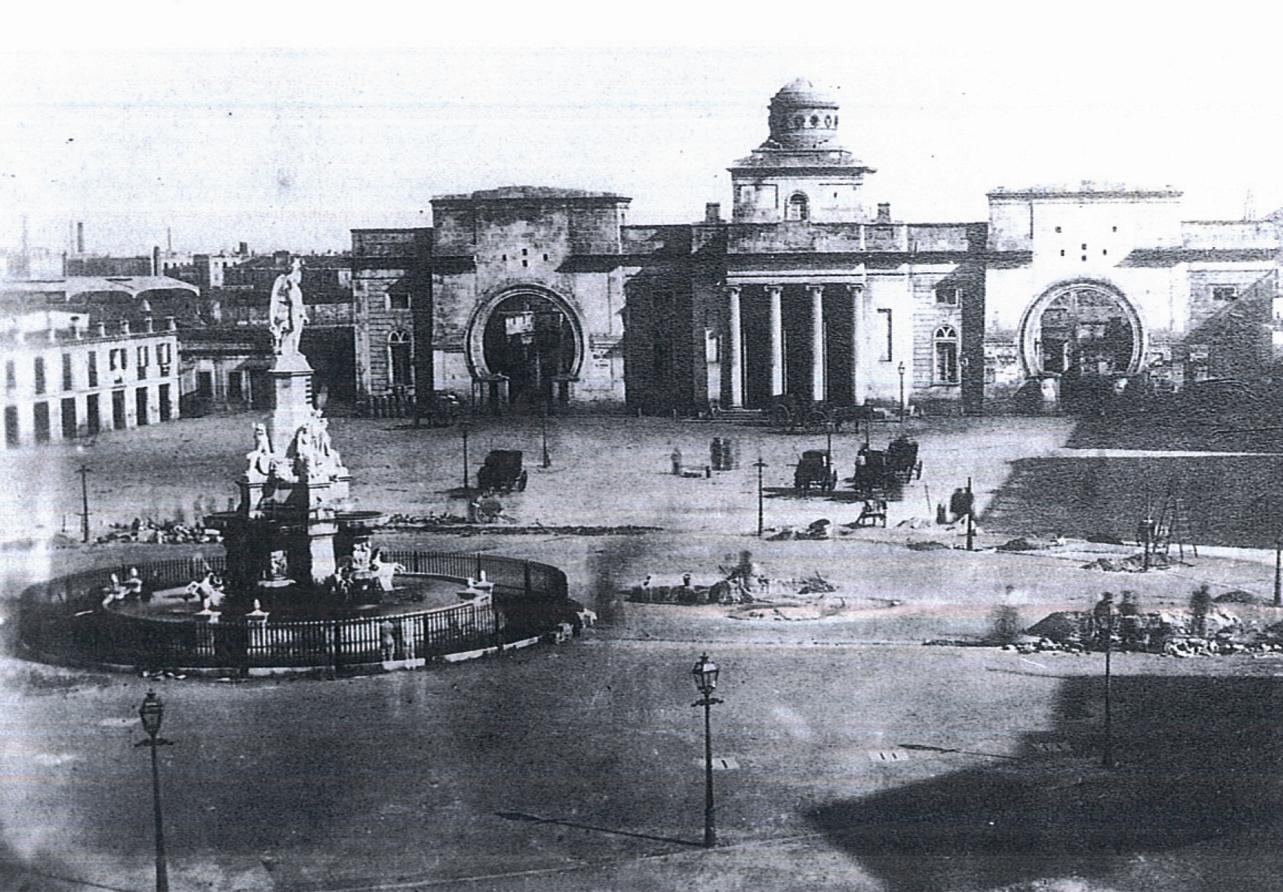
Portal de Mar around 1858, with the Fuente del Genio Catalán.

Josep Massanès i Mestres (Spanish: José Massanés y Mestres) (Barcelona, 1777 – Barcelona, 1857) was a Spanish Military engineer and architect.

== Biography ==
He trained at the Escuela de la Lonja in Barcelona. He joined the army at the outbreak of the Peninsular War (1808), as a captain of sappers. In 1811, he participated in the attempt to liberate the Montjuïc Castle. In 1825, he was appointed commander of the Cantabria infantry regiment. In 1832, he obtained the title of architect from the Real Academia de San Fernando. In 1844, he was promoted to lieutenant colonel, and shortly after to colonel.

Of constitutionalist and liberal ideology, he was confined between 1827 and 1829, going into exile in France until the amnesty of 1832.

In 1818, he presented to Captain General Castaños an initial idea for an expansion of Barcelona, which was not carried out. The following year he was assigned to Tarragona, where he drew up a topographic map of the city. That year he requested permission to participate in the Greek War of Independence, but it was denied.

In 1819, he created the tomb of General Castaños's father in the church of Nuestra Señora del Lledó in Valls.

Commissioned by the Diputación de Barcelona, in 1821 he was in charge of drafting the division of Catalonia into four provinces.

In 1833, he was in charge of the renovation of Pla de Palau, and between 1844 and 1848 he built the Portal de Mar in the same square, a monumental portico providing access to la Barceloneta from the square, which was demolished in 1859. Of eclectic style, it mixed classical, Gothic, and oriental elements, and consisted of a gateway with four Ionic columns, a stepped frontón, and a dome, while on the sides there were monumental horseshoe arches supported by double columns.

Massanès was also the author of an expansion plan in 1838, which encompassed the triangle between Canaletas, plaza de la Universidad, and plaza de Urquinaona, and which already sketched what would become Plaça de Catalunya, located at the center of the triangle. He was also the author of the layouts of Cervantes and Sobradiel streets and the Paseo del Cementerio.

He was a member of the Real Academia de Bellas Artes de San Fernando.

He was the father of the writer Maria Josepa Massanès.

== See also ==
- Architecture of Barcelona

== Bibliography ==
- Barral i Altet, Xavier; Beseran, Pere; Canalda, Sílvia; Guardià, Marta; Jornet, Núria (2000). Guia del Patrimoni Monumental i Artístic de Catalunya, vol. 1 [Guide to the Monumental and Artistic Heritage of Catalonia, vol. 1] (in Catalan). Barcelona: Pòrtic. ISBN 84-7306-947-1.
- Fontbona, Francesc (1997). Història de l'art català VI. Del neoclassicisme a la Restauració 1808-1888 [History of Catalan Art VI. From Neoclassicism to the Restoration 1808-1888] (in Catalan). Barcelona: Edicions 62. ISBN 84-297-2064-2.
- Ràfols, J.F. (1951). Diccionario Biográfico de Artistas de Cataluña, vol. 1 [Biographical Dictionary of Artists of Catalonia, vol. 1]. Barcelona: Millá.
