= Avinguda de la Llum =

Former underground mall in Barcelona

Coordinates: 41°23′09″N 2°10′06″E

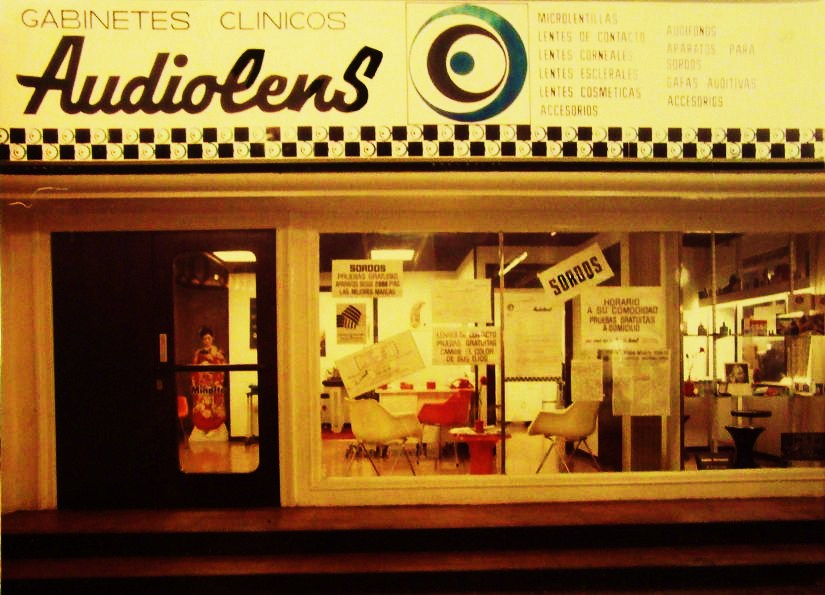
One of the shops in Avinguda de la Llum.

Avinguda de la Llum (Catalan for Avenue of Light; Spanish: Avenida de la Luz) is a now-closed underground mall in Barcelona, the first of its kind to open in Europe. It was open between 1940 and 1990, located on a 2000 square-metre site built in 1929 and boasting 68 commercial establishments, including a movie theater. It was situated underneath Carrer de Pelai, between Plaça de Catalunya, Carrer de Balmes, Carrer de Bergara and Plaça de la Universitat, upstairs of the Ferrocarrils de la Generalitat de Catalunya (FGC) station Catalunya, between its vaults and the street.

Despite initially being part of an ambitious plan to build an underground city from Plaça Urquinaona to Plaça de la Universitat, the urban decay prevalent in the area from the 1960s onwards prompted its progressive abandonment. The Avinguda de la Llum was in a state of decay and had a large homeless population by the time of its closure on May 21, 1990. On the ground upstairs stood an empty triangular area between buildings which came to be called Triangle de la vergonya ("Triangle of shame"), which contributed to the adoption of measures to renovate the area in time for the 1992 Summer Olympics.

Nowadays its main corridor is part of the underground floor of a Sephora store in the El Triangle shopping centre (its successor), while some parts of it are still abandoned and remain closed to the public.

== In popular culture ==
- It features in Bigas Luna's 1978 film Bilbao.
- The rock band Loquillo y los Trogloditas wrote a song about this mall called "Avenida de la Luz".
- It features in The Labyrinth of Spirits (original title: El laberinto de los espíritus), a fiction novel by Spanish author Carlos Ruiz Zafón. This is the fourth and final book in the Cemetery of Forgotten Books series.

== See also ==
- List of missing landmarks in Spain
- Mole people
- Effects of the Barcelona Olympic Games
