= Ronda de Sant Pau =

Street in Barcelona, Spain

- Ronda de San Pablo
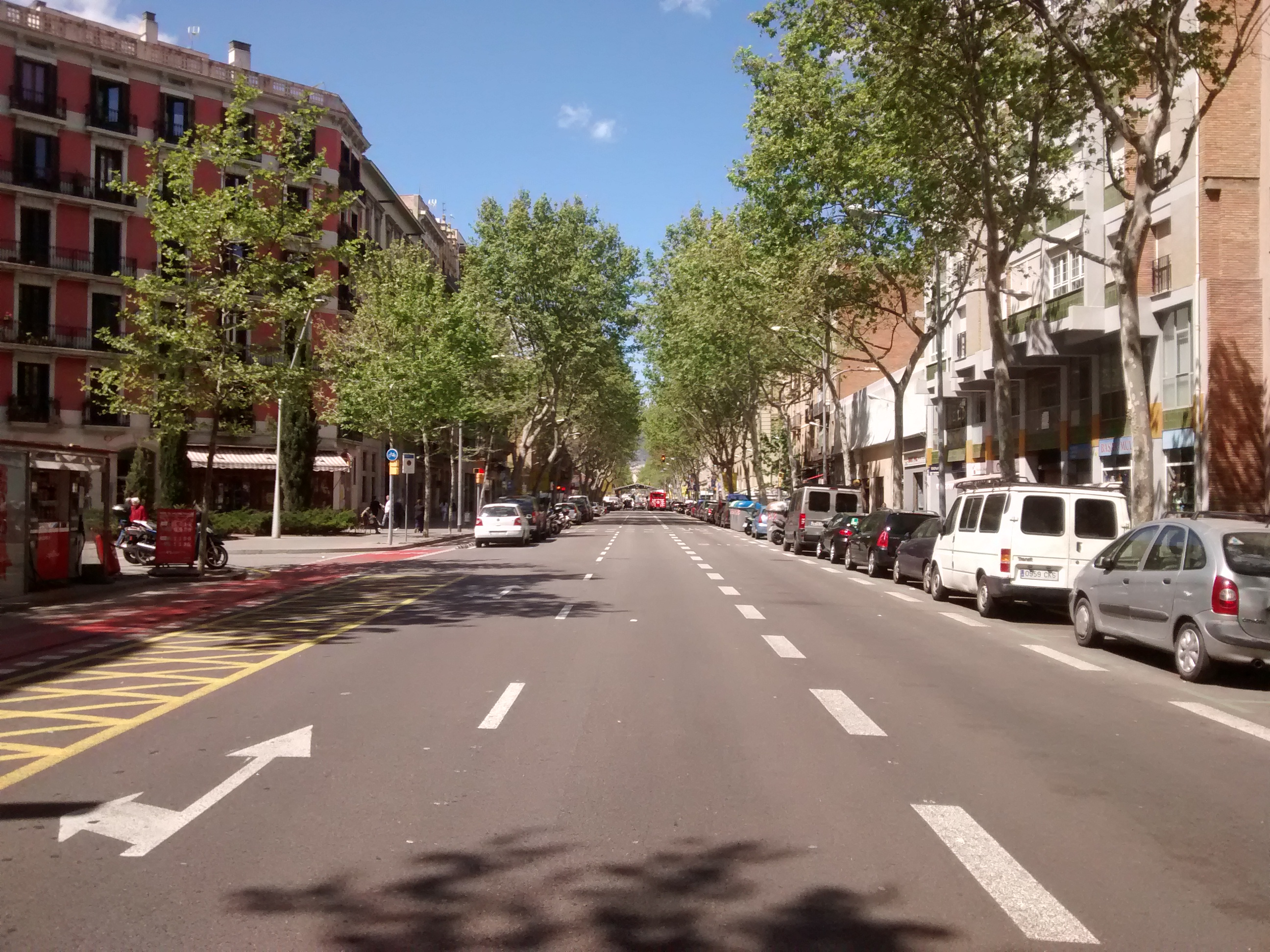

Major junctions
- Avinguda del Paral·lel, Ronda de Sant Antoni, Carrer de Sant Pau

Location
- Country: Spain

Highway system
- Highways in Spain; Autopistas and autovías; National Roads

The Ronda de Sant Pau (in Spanish: Ronda de San Pablo) is located in Barcelona (Spain). It forms the border between the districts of Ciutat Vella (El Raval neighbourhood) and Eixample (Sant Antoni neighbourhood). It starts at Avinguda del Paral-lel and ends at Ronda de Sant Antoni and Carrer del Conde d'Urgel.

== History ==
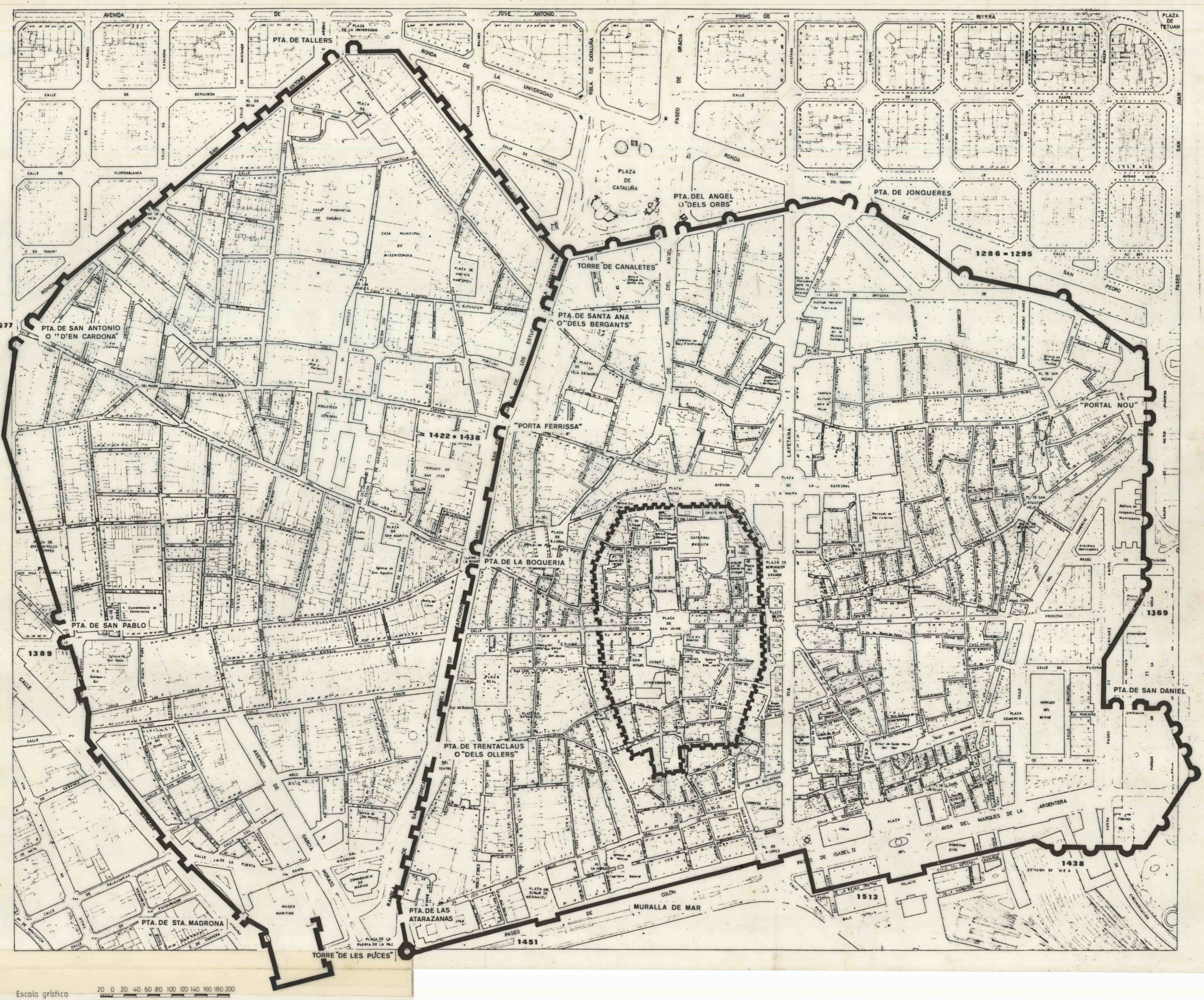
Plan of medieval Barcelona with the walled perimeter corresponding to the 15th century. The Ronda de Sant Pau corresponds to the central section on the left.

Built on top of the 1389 city wall, it was given this name because it is near the exit of the Carrer de Sant Pau and in memory of an old gateway of the same name that was open seasonally on the site.

During the Middle Ages, the wall of El Raval, built between the 14th and 15th centuries due to the continuous urban growth of the city, stood on this site. The new urban area started at the Atarazanas, following the current Rondas de Sant Pau, Sant Antoni, Universitat and Sant Pere, down the current Passeig de Lluís Companys to the monastery of Santa Clara —in the current Parc de la Ciutadella— and to the sea, along the current Avinguda Marqués de la Argentera.

In the mid-19th century, the increase in population and the consequent risk to public health made it advisable to demolish the medieval walls, which took place in 1854, thus opening the way for the territorial expansion of the city —the Eixample— and the opening of new roads in the place of the walls, such as the Rondas de Sant Pau, Sant Antoni, Universitat and Sant Pere.

== See also ==
- Ronda de la Universitat
- Street names in Barcelona
- Urban planning of Barcelona

== Bibliography ==
- Roig, Josep L. (1995). Historia de Barcelona [History of Barcelona] (in Spanish). Barcelona: Primera Plana S.A. ISBN 84-8130-039-X.
