= Carrer de Bergara, Barcelona =

Street in Barcelona, Catalonia, Spain

Coordinates: 41.3862°N 2.1682°E

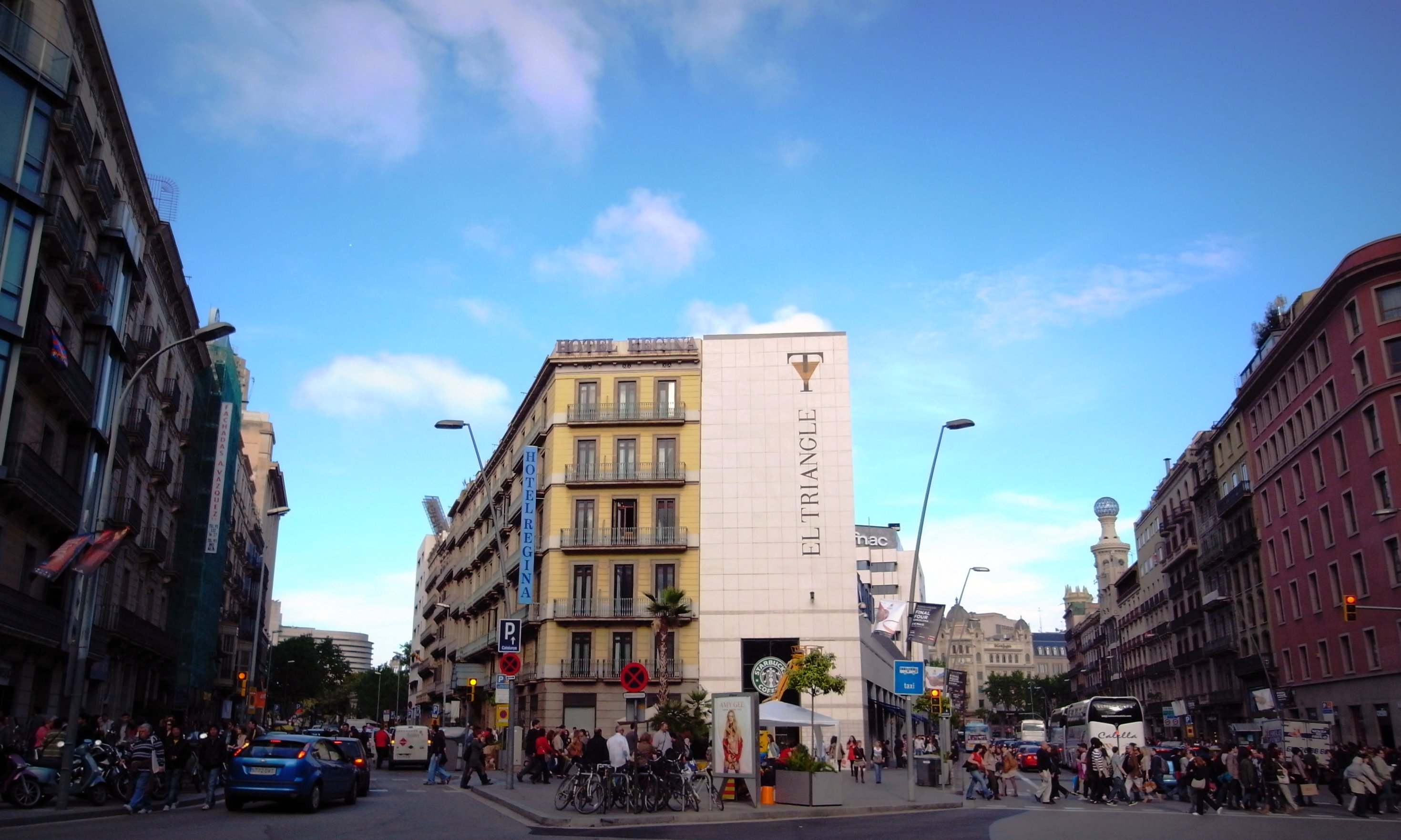
Career de Bergara

Carrer de Bergara (sometimes, but not officially, Vergara, using the Spanish spelling of the Basque name) is a short street in central Barcelona, stretching from Plaça Catalunya towards Carrer de Pelai. It's in the Eixample district. It's named after the Basque city of Bergara, where an armistice was signed at the end the First Carlist War in 1839. The name of the street was approved in 1900. The street is home to a number of restaurants, cafes, and hotels.

== Transport ==
- Barcelona Metro station Catalunya, on lines L1 and L3 can be accessed from both sides of the street, and near its north-western end is an access to the FGC railway station of the same name.

== See also ==
- List of streets and squares in Eixample, Barcelona
- Avinguda de la Llum
