= Vicente Urrabieta =

Spanish illustrator and lithographer (died 1879)

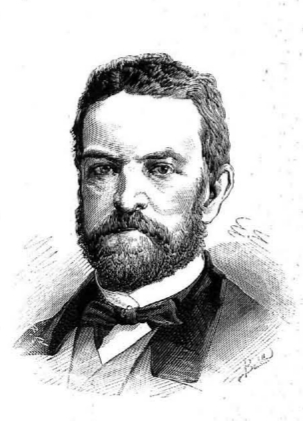
- Vicente Urrabieta, in La Ilustración Española y Americana
- Born: Vicente Urrabieta y Ortiz; 1813/1823; Bilbao or Madrid, Spain
- Died: 26 December 1879; París, France
- Occupations: Illustrator, draftsman, lithographer
- Honours: Knight of the Order of San Fernando

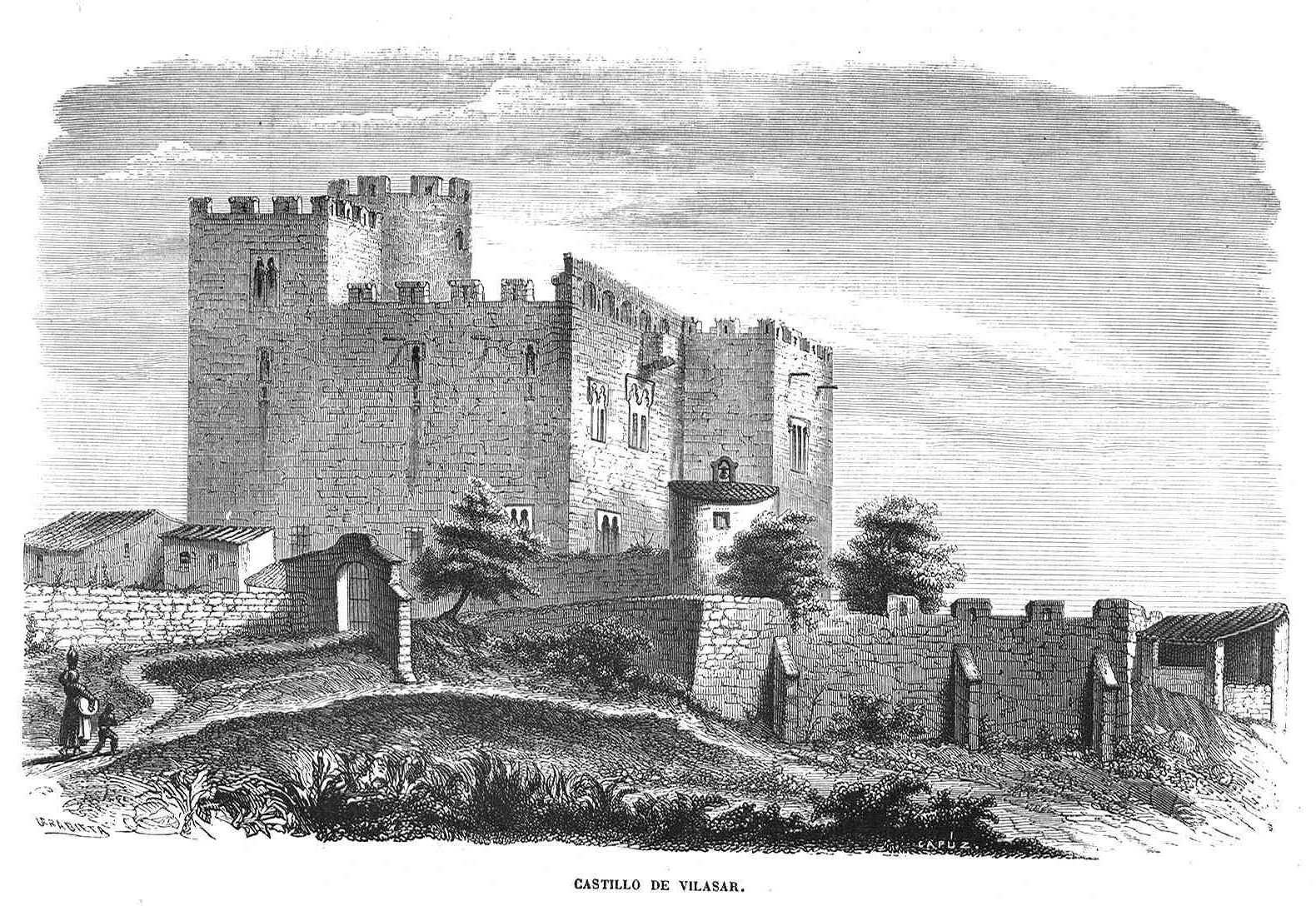
Castle of Vilasar, in El Museo Universal, January 1857.

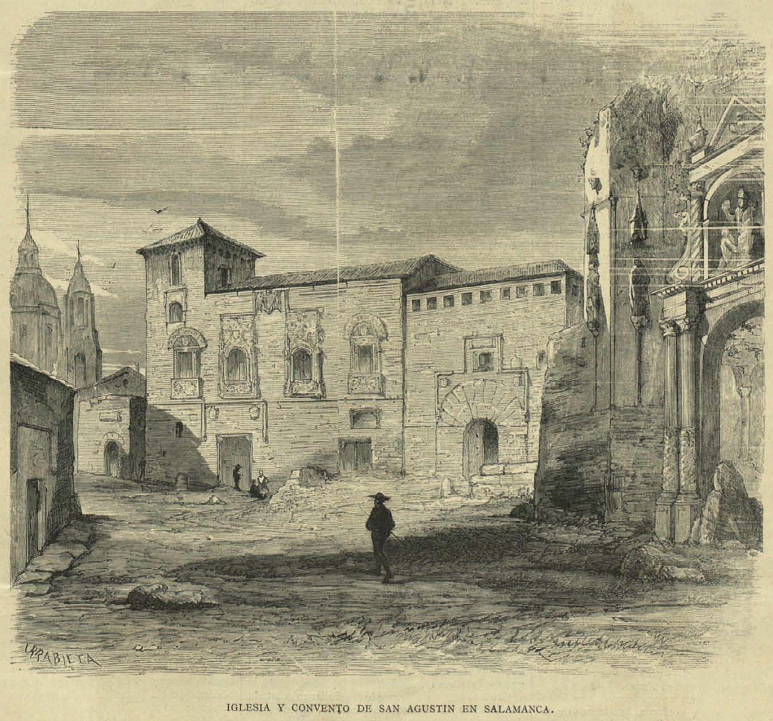
Church and convent of San Agustín in Salamanca, republished in La Ilustración Católica in 1882, after Urrabieta's death.

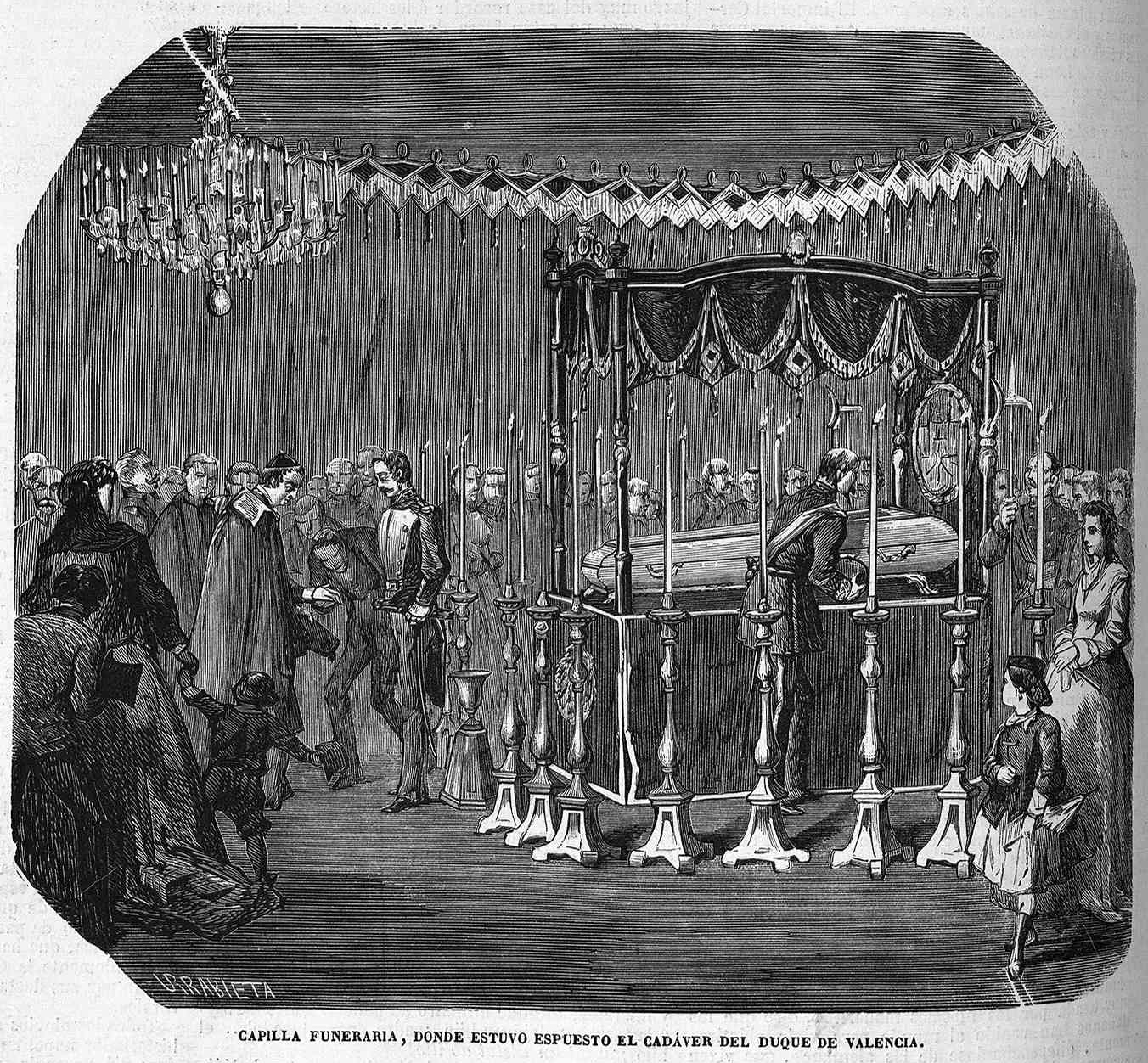
Engraving of the funerary chapel of Ramón María Narváez, published on May 2, 1868 in El Museo Universal; the general died on April 23.

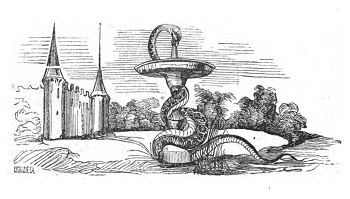
Illustration by Urrabieta for the novel Matilde, or Memoirs drawn from the history of the crusades, in an 1847 edition of the Gaspar y Roig printing house and bookstore.

Vicente Urrabieta y Ortiz (1813/23 – 1879) was a Spanish draftsman, lithographer and illustrator, father of the also artist Daniel Urrabieta Vierge.

== Biography ==
He was born in Bilbao or Madrid (Note: Regarding his place of birth, two options are considered: Madrid or Bilbao. Bilbao is proposed by the art historian Francesc Fontbona, while in La Vanguardia he is described as "a Madrid-born draftsman", Marthold states that he was born in Madrid and the work Parroquia madrileña de San Sebastián: algunos personajes de su archivo describes him as a native of Madrid.) in the first quarter of the 19th century. (Note: Regarding his date of birth, two options are considered: 1813 and 1823. The date 1813 is cited by Francesc Fontbona, moreover Bosch, in a biographical note on Vicente Urrabieta in La Ilustración Española y Americana published in 1890, maintains that "when in 1830 D. Vicente Urrabieta, who was only seventeen years old at the time", which would seem to corroborate the date of 1813. However Jules Marthold cites 1823 (Né en 1823, á Madrid, alors que le roi et les Cortès étaient réfugiés á Séville, Vicente Urrabieta Ortiz), referring to the Cortes taking refuge in Seville due to the invasion of the Hundred Thousand Sons of Saint Louis, which would end the period of the Trienio Liberal. In the work Parroquia madrileña de San Sebastián: algunos personajes de su archivo, it is cited that Vicente Urrabieta married Juana Vierge on June 16, 1845, he being 22 years old and she 20, which would attest to the birth date of 1823.) (Note: According to his death certificate registered in Paris, he was born in Madrid and it can be deduced that he was born in 1823 (note, Vicente is written in French: Vincent) «Du vingt-six décembre mil huit cent soixante-dix-neuf, à trois heures du soir Acte de décès dûment constaté de Vincent Urrabieta, artiste-peintre, décédé en son domicile, à Paris, rue du Cherche-Midi, n° 109, hier, à neuf heure du soir (…) à l’âge de cinquante-six ans, natif de Madrid (Espagne) fils de Julian Urrabieta et de Dolorès Ortiz, son épouse, décédés ; marié à Juana Vierge (…)») Urrabieta gained recognition for his illustrations of the novel Matilde o Las Cruzadas, published by Gaspar y Roig. (Note: Although Bosch mentions that he would have done so at age 17 in 1830, it is possible he erred in this detail, as several sources indicate that Urrabieta was born in 1823, as can be seen in a previous note.) He consolidated his artistic reputation by collaborating with illustrations in the Semanario Pintoresco Español (Spanish Picturesque Weekly) and by handling the illustrated part of the Escenas Matritenses (Scenes from Madrid)by Mesonero Romanos, of the popular work by Wenceslao Ayguals de Izco, María or of La hija de un jornalero, among others. The magazine La Ilustración (The illustration) counted him among its most active collaborators, in addition to participating in Álbum Pintoresco (Picturesque Album), El Siglo Pintoresco (The Picturesque Century), Museo de las Familias (Museum of Families), El Artista (The Artist), La Ilustración Española y Americana (Spanish and American Illustration), La Risa (The Laugh), La Educación Pintoresca (Picturesque Education), La Aurora de la Vida (The Aurora of Life) and La Lectura para Todos (Reading for Everyone).

In 1851, he made his first trip to France and England, where he studied the progress of lithography, one of his preferred techniques. Upon his return to Spain he undertook the publication of the novel by Mariano José de Larra El doncel de don Enrique el doliente (The squire of Don Enrique the Sorrowful), illustrated with lithographs. This collaboration, in which Urrabieta had placed great hopes, failed, it is said due to the mismanagement of the person entrusted with the financial handling. He also made numerous illustrations for the Historia de Cataluña y de la Corona de Aragón (History of Catalonia and the Crown of Aragon) by Víctor Balaguer, published between 1869 and 1863, including that of the frontispiece, a joint work with the engraver Roca. His illustrations also appeared in various Parisian publications, the city where he eventually resided. In 1872, he worked as a correspondent for Le Monde Illustré during the Third Carlist War. That same year, some of his drawings of this conflict also appeared in La Ilustración Española y Americana. He held the title of knight of the Order of San Fernando.

He died on December 26, 1879 in Paris. His funeral, which took place at the Montparnasse Cemetery, was attended by Fernández de los Ríos, various French and Spanish journalists, and representatives from various publishing houses. In 1845, he married Juana Vierge, a woman of French origin.Their three children also worked as illustrators: Daniel, known in the art world by his mother's surname, "Vierge", Samuel, who worked in a chromolithography workshop in Paris, and Dolores.

He was described by Francesc Fontbona as "a classic of romantic illustration in the Spanish state" and in 1904 it was stated that in his time he was considered in Spain as one of the most "effective" illustrators in the country.
