= Carrer del Consell de Cent, Barcelona =

Avenue in Barcelona, Catalonia, Spain

Coordinates: 41.3979°N 2.1747°E

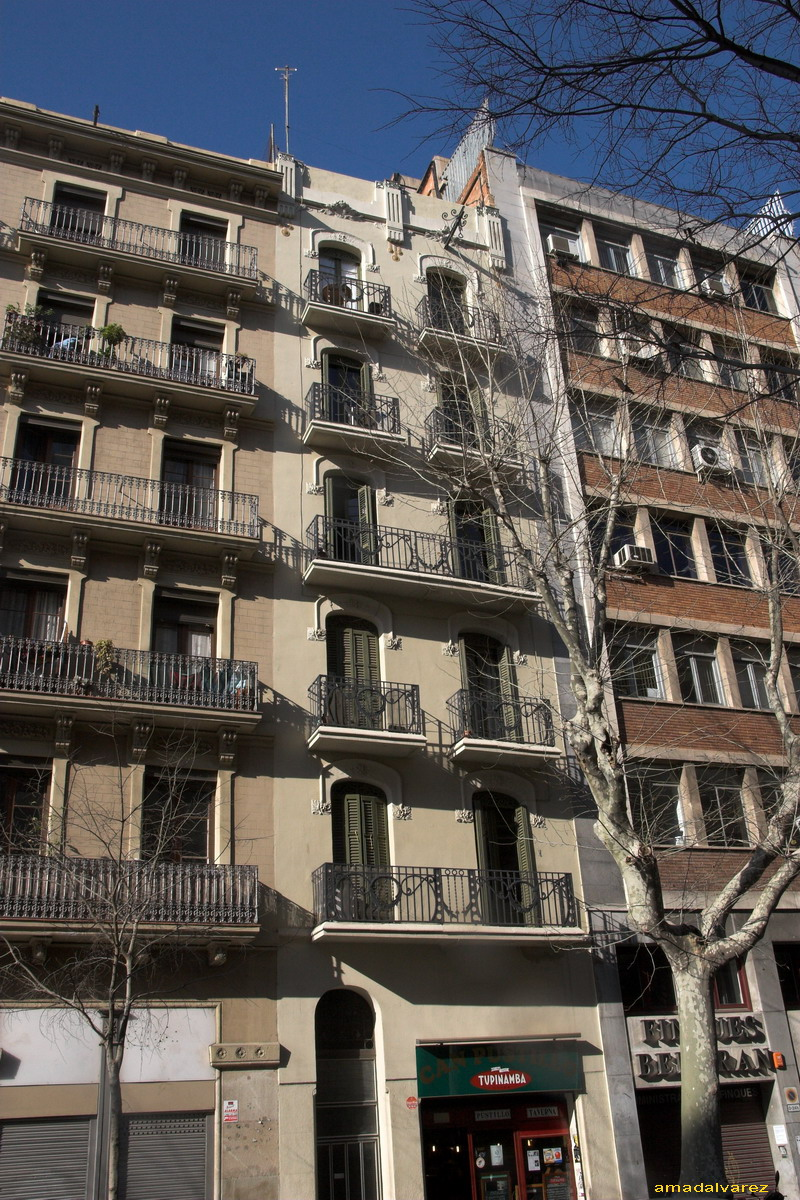
Carrer del Consell de Cent

Carrer del Consell de Cent (official Catalan name: Carrer del Consell de Cent, in Spanish: Calle del Consejo de Ciento) is a long avenue in Barcelona, Catalonia, Spain. It is one of the horizontal streets of the urban grid that makes up Eixample district, spanning the Esquerra de l'Eixample and the Dreta de l'Eixample quarters, starting at the Parc de Joan Miró by carrer de Vilamarí and ending in the neighbourhood of El Clot, by Avinguda Meridiana, in the Sant Martí district.

It is named after one of Catalonia's ancient government institutions: the Consell de Cent, the "Council of a Hundred", based in Barcelona. The street's name was approved in 1900, and has never officially changed (but the name has indeed changed of official language). Its original denomination on Ildefons Cerdà's plan, however, was Ll (a separate letter in the Spanish alphabet before 1994).

The central 20 blocks of the street have been converted in 2023 to a living street, as part of the municipality's Superilles (Superblock) programme. This provides an environment where pedestrians have priority, but cycles and motor vehicles retain access at a low speed.

== Remarkable architecture ==
- Casa Josep Cerdà (19th century) by Antoni Valls Galí - The first four buildings that followed Ildefons Cerdà's now famous urban plan were on the corner between carrer de Roger de Llúria and Consell de Cent. Casa Josep Cerdà, on Consell de Cent 340, is a fine example of eclectic architecture, remarkable for its ornate façade.
- Convent i Col·legi de Maria Immaculada (1888–1910) by Josep Pérez Terraza with additions by Enric Sagnier i Villavecchia - This religious building is a mixture of modern architecture with neogothic elements.
- Església i Convent de les Adoratrius (19th century) by Joan Martorell Montells - Small church and convent in the neo-gothic style.

== Transport ==
=== Barcelona Metro ===
- Passeig de Gràcia, on lines L2, L3, L4
- Girona, on line L4

=== Bus ===
- Bus lines 62, 92
- Night bus lines N3,

== Bars and clubs ==
"Left" of Passeig de Gràcia, in the Esquerra de l'Eixample, lies the so-called Gaixample, a gay village. Carrer del Consell de Cent is one of the streets in that area, with some venues like Átame, Crazy's, Dacksy, Sazzerak...

== Libraries ==
- Col·legi Oficial d'Enginyers Tècnics i Industrials de Barcelona

== See also ==
Historical study of the Casas Cerdà, written by Elena Moral and Cynthia Emmi

- List of streets and squares in Eixample, Barcelona
