= Carrer de Pelai, Barcelona =

Street in Barcelona, Catalonia, Spain

Coordinates: 41.38607°N 2.16752°E

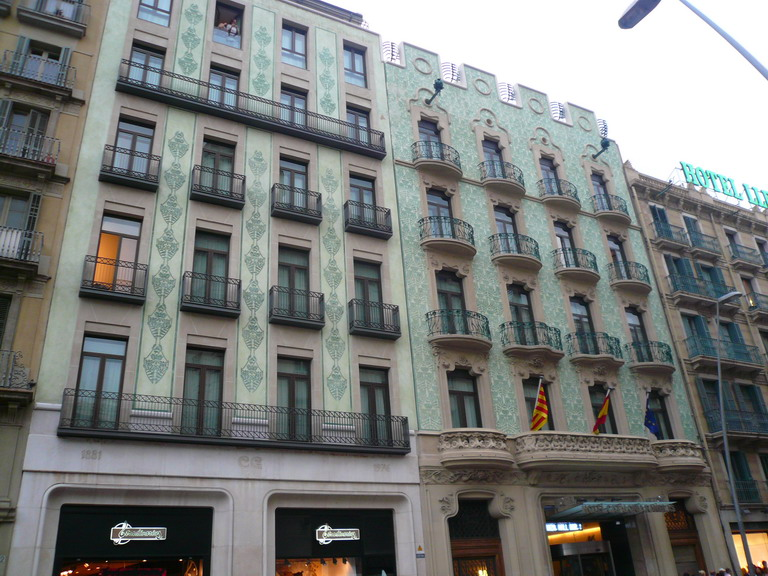
Former headquarters of La Vanguardia, now a hotel.

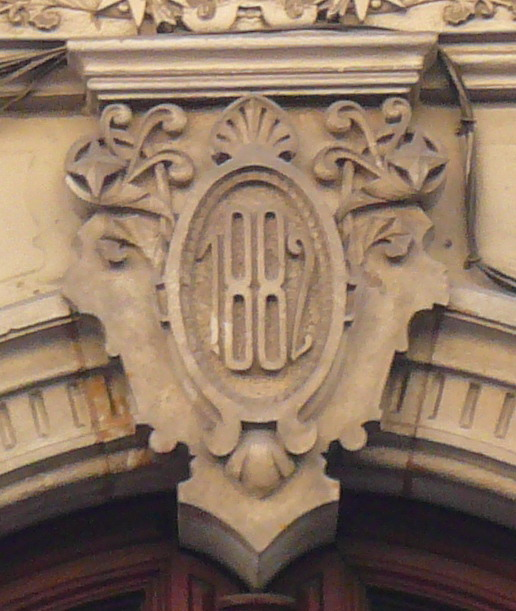
Building date on a door, on 18 Carrer Pelai.

Carrer de Pelai (official Catalan name; sometimes called, in Spanish, Calle de Pelayo) is a major shopping street in Barcelona, one of the busiest in the city at daytime. It forms the border between the districts of Ciutat Vella and Eixample in the center of the city, and runs from the intersection of Plaça de Catalunya with La Rambla and the El Triangle shopping centre to Plaça de la Universitat. It is named after King Pelagius of Asturias. The current Catalan-language name was approved in 1980 by the city council, though it also bore that same name before 1900.

== Transport ==
- Barcelona Metro stations Catalunya (L1, L3, L6 and L7) and Universitat (L1, L2).

== See also ==
- List of streets and squares in Eixample, Barcelona
- Avinguda de la Llum
