= List of streets and squares in Eixample, Barcelona =

This is a full list of streets and squares in L'Eixample, a district of Barcelona, Catalonia, Spain.

== List ==
=== A ===
- Aldana, carrer d'
- Alí Bei, carrer d'
- Almogàvers, carrer dels
- Anaïs Napoléon, jardins d' (Anaïs Napoleón)
- Aragó, carrer d'
- Aribau, carrer d'
- Arts, plaça de les
- Ausiàs Marc, carrer d'

=== B ===
- Bailèn, carrer de
- Balmes, carrer de
- Batlló, passatge de
- Beatriu de Provença, jardins de
- Bergara, carrer de
- Bocabella, passatge
- Bofill, passatge de
- Bosquet dels Encants, jardins del
- Bruc, carrer del
- Buenos Aires, carrer de

=== C ===
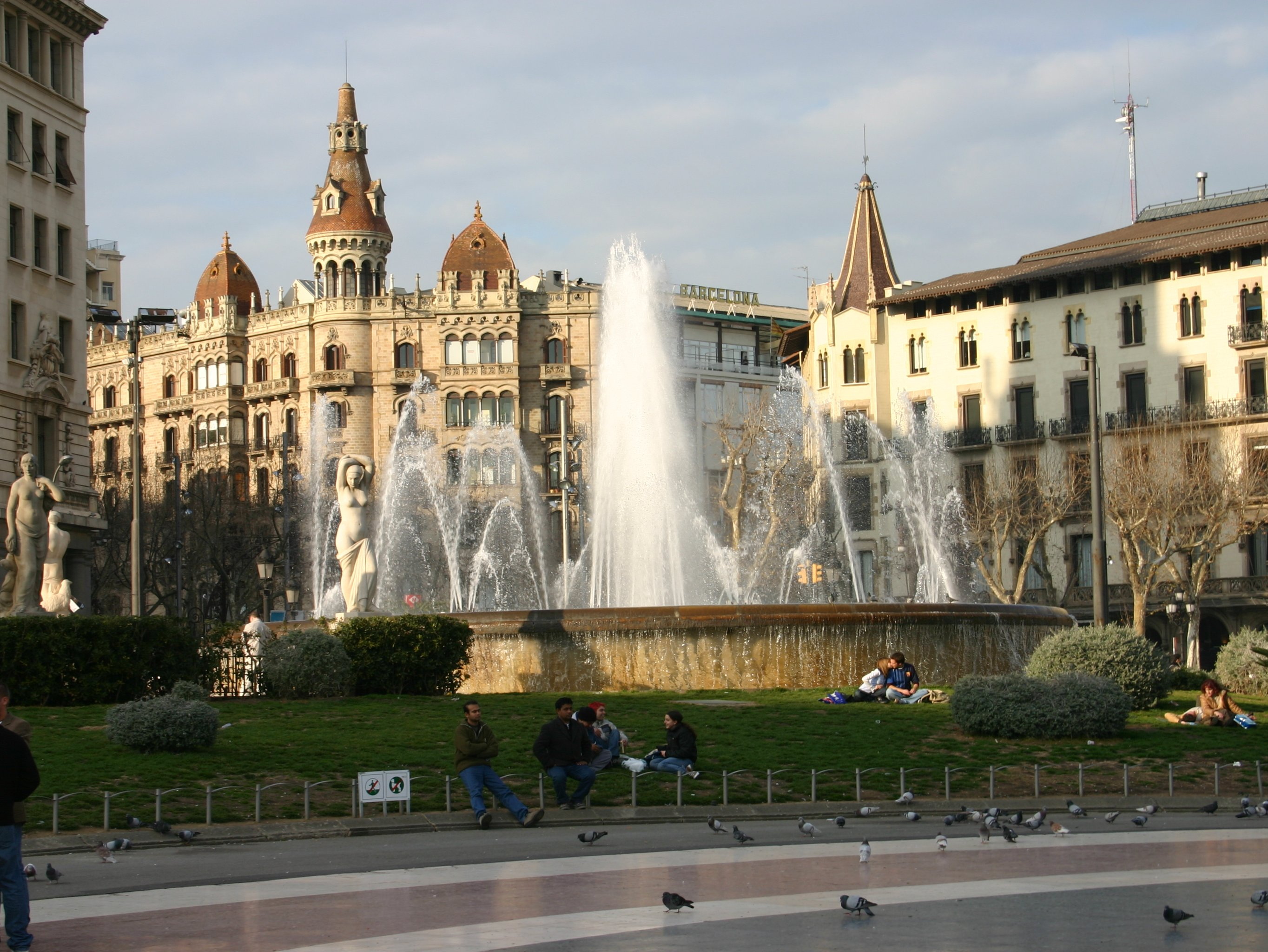
Plaça de Catalunya

- Calàbria, carrer de
- Camps Elisis, passatge dels
- Canonge Cluffí, passatge del
- Caputxins, passatge dels
- Carlit, jardins del
- Cartagena, carrer de
- Casanova, carrer de
- Casp, carrer de
- Catalunya, plaça de
- Catalunya, rambla de
- Centelles, passatge de
- Cèsar Mantinell, jardins de
- Cinc d'Oros, plaça de
- Clotilde Cerdà, jardins de (Clotilde Cerdà)
- Coll del Portell, passatge de
- Comte Borrell, carrer del
- Comte d'Urgell, carrer del
- Concepció, passatge de la
- Consell de Cent, carrer del
- Constança d'Aragó, jardins de
- Còrsega, carrer de

=== D ===
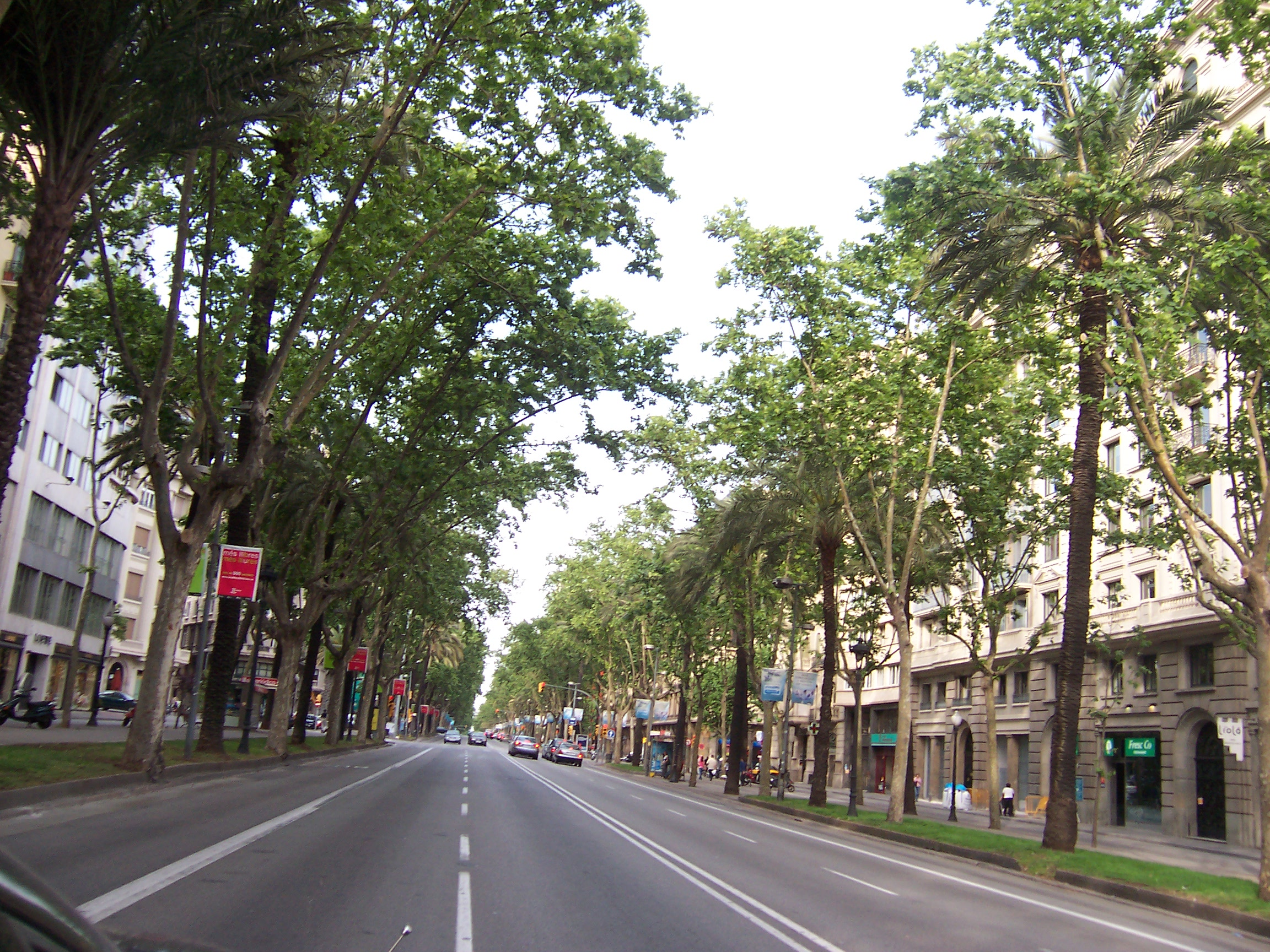
Avinguda Diagonal

- Diagonal, avinguda
- Diputació, carrer de la
- Doctor Ferrer i Cajigal, plaça del
- Doctor Letamendi, plaça del
- Doctor Robert, jardins del
- Domingo, passatge de

=== E ===
- Emerssenda de Carcassona, jardins d'
- Emma de Barcelona, jardins d'
- Enamorats, carrer dels
- Enric Granados, carrer d'
- Enriqueta Sèculi, jardins d'
- Entença, carrer d'
- Escoles, passatge de les
- Estació del Nord, parc de l'

=== F ===
- Flora Tristan, jardins de
- Floridablanca, carrer de
- Font, passatge de
- Fontanella, carrer de

=== G ===
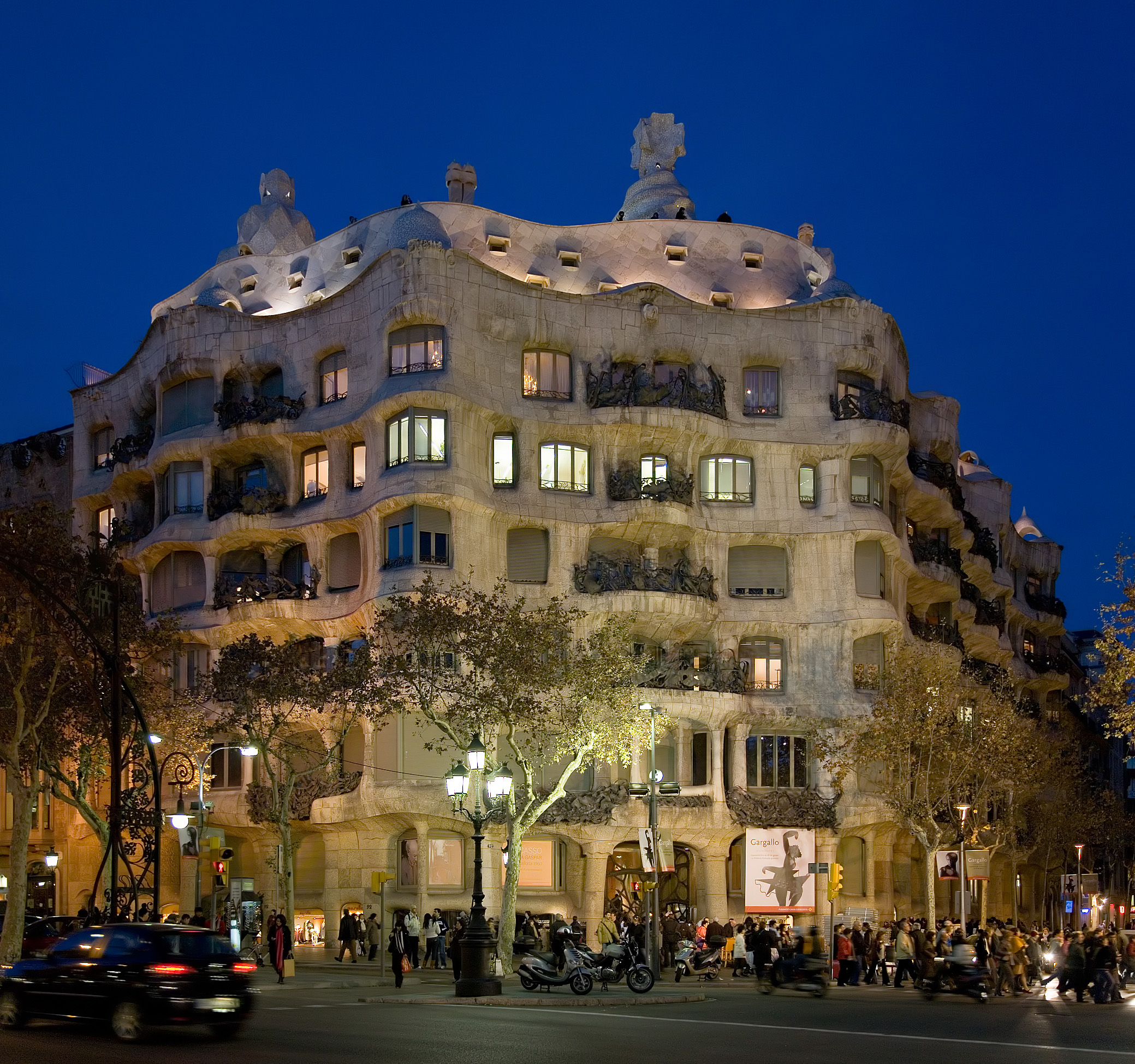
Casa Milà by Antoni Gaudi on the Passeig de Gràcia

- Gaiolà, passatge de
- Gaudí, avinguda de
- Gaudí, plaça de
- Girona, carrer de
- Goya, plaça de
- Gràcia, passeig de
- Gran Via de les Corts Catalanes

=== H ===
- Henry Dunant, plaça d'
- Hispanitat, plaça de la

=== I ===
- Igualtat, passatge de la
- Indústria, carrer de la
- Indústria, jardins de la

=== J ===
- Jaume Perich, jardins de
- Joan Brossa, placeta de
- Joan Casas, passatge de
- Joan Miró, parc de
- Avinguda de Josep Tarradellas, Barcelona

=== L ===
- Laietana, Via
- Laura Albéniz, jardins de
- Lepant, carrer de
- Lina Òdena, jardins de
- Llançà, carrer de
- Lluís Companys, passeig de
- Londres, carrer de
- Los Castillejos, carrer de

=== M ===
- Maiol, passatge de
- Mallorca, carrer de
- Manso, carrer de
- Manuel de Pedrolo, jardins de
- Marcos Redondo, jardins de
- Maria Callas, jardins de
- Marina, carrer de la
- Marquès de Camposagrado, carrer del
- Méndez Vigo, passatge de
- Méndez Núñez, carrer de
- Mercader, passatge de
- Mercat, passatge del
- Mercè Vilaret, jardins de
- Meridiana, avinguda
- Mistral, avinguda
- Mossèn Jacint Verdaguer, plaça de
- Montserrat Roig, jardins de
- Muntaner, carrer de

=== N ===
- Nàpols, carrer de
- Nicaragua, carrer de
- Núria, passatge de

=== P ===
- Pablo Neruda, plaça de
- Padilla, carrer de
- Pagès, passatge de
- París, carrer de
- París, passatge de
- Parlament, carrer del
- Paula Montal, jardins de
- Pere Calders, passatge de
- Permanyer, passatge
- Provença, carrer de

=== R ===
- Rector Oliveras, jardins de
- Rector Oliveras, passatge de
- Ribes, carrer de
- Rocafort, carrer de
- Roger de Flor, carrer de
- Roger de Flor, passatge de
- Roger de Llúria, carrer de
- Roma, avinguda
- Rosselló, carrer del

=== S ===
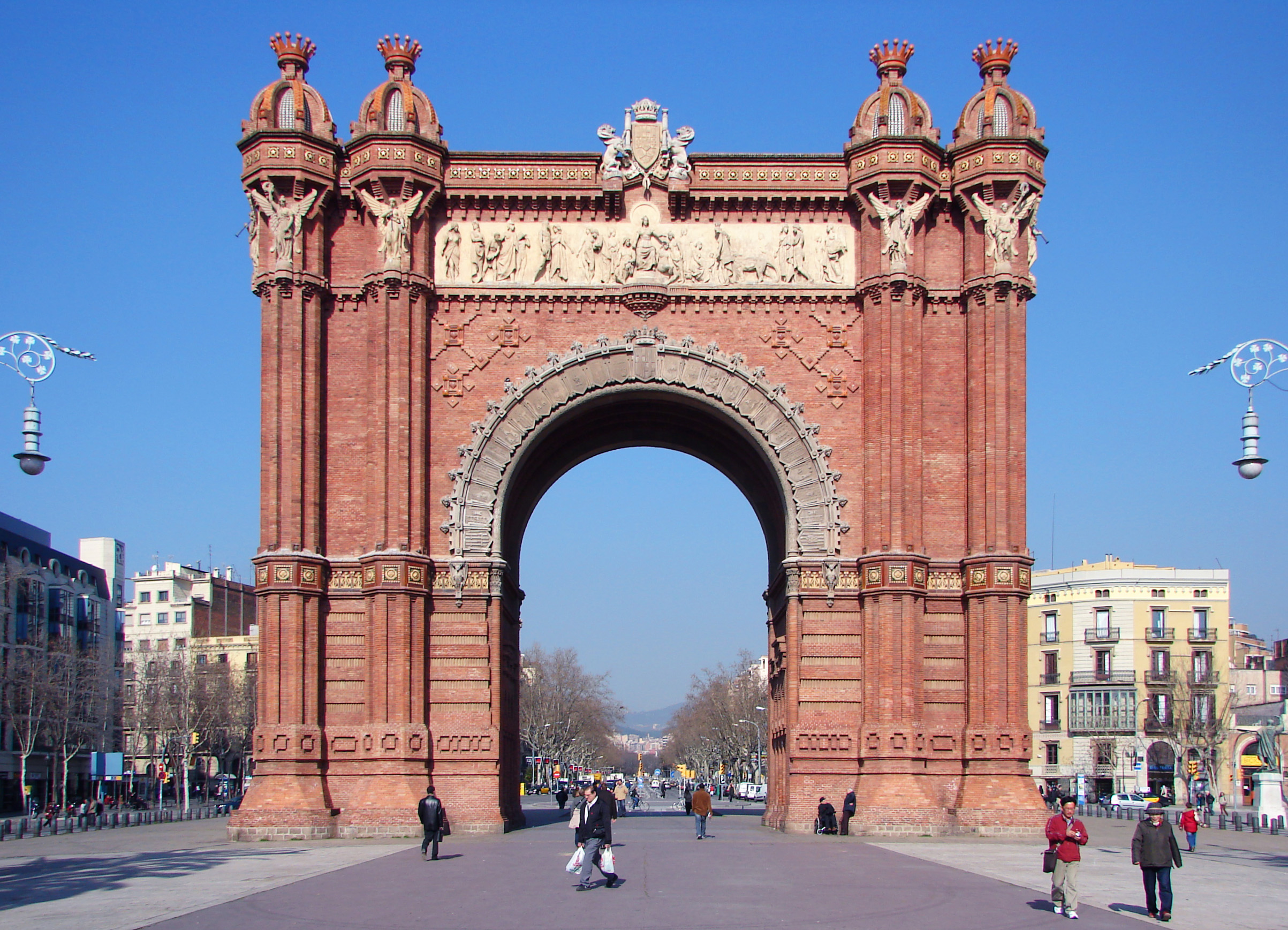
Arc de Triomf on the Passeig de Sant Joan

- Sagrada Família, plaça de la
- Sagristà, passatge d'en
- Sant Antoni Abat, passatge de
- Sant Antoni Maria Claret, carrer de
- Sant Joan, passeig de
- Sant Pau, ronda de
- Sant Pere, ronda de
- Sardenya, carrer de
- Sarrià, avinguda de
- Sebastià Gasch, jardins de
- Sepúlveda, carrer de
- Sicília, carrer de
- Simó, passatge de
- Sofia Barat, jardins de

=== T ===
- Tamarit, carrer de
- Tarragona, carrer de
- Tasso, passatge de
- Tete Montoliu, jardins de
- Tetuan, plaça de
- Torre de les Aigües, jardins de la
- Trafalgar, carrer de
- Tres Tombs, jardins dels

=== U ===
- Universitat, plaça de la
- Universitat, ronda de la
- Ureña, passatge d'
- Urquinaona, plaça d'
- Utset, passatge d'

=== V ===
- València, carrer de
- Valeri Serra, passatge de
- Valls, passatge de
- Viladomat, carrer de
- Vilanova, avinguda de
- Vilamarí, carrer de
- Vilaret, passatge de
- Villarroel, carrer de

== See also ==
- Urban planning of Barcelona
