= José María de Urquinaona y Vidot =

Catholic bishop

- Bishop of Barcelona
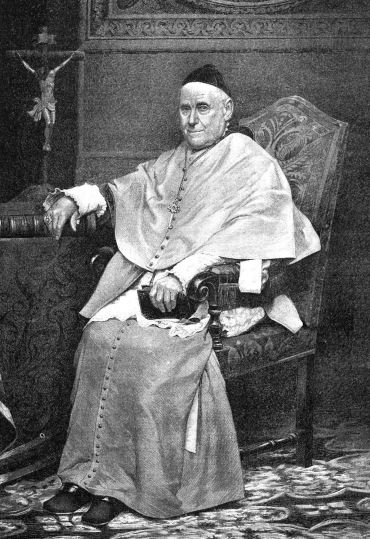
- Church: Catholic Church
- Diocese: Diocese of Barcelona
- In office: 15 July 1878 – 31 March 1883
- Predecessor: Joaquín Lluch y Garriga
- Successor: Jaume Català i Albosa
- Previous post: Bishop of Canarias (1868-1878)

Orders
- Ordination: 23 September 1837
- Consecration: 7 March 1869 by Félix María Arrieta y Llano

Personal details
- Born: 4 September 1814 Cádiz, Kingdom of Spain
- Died: 31 March 1883 (aged 68)

José María Urquinaona y Bidot (or Vidot) (4 September 1814 – 31 March 1883) was a bishop of Barcelona. Born in Cádiz, he was presented at the First Vatican Council as secretary of the bishops from Spain. In 1878, he was made bishop of Barcelona. The Plaça Urquinaona is named after him.
