= Carrer d'Ausiàs Marc, Barcelona =

Street in Eixample, Barcelona, Spain

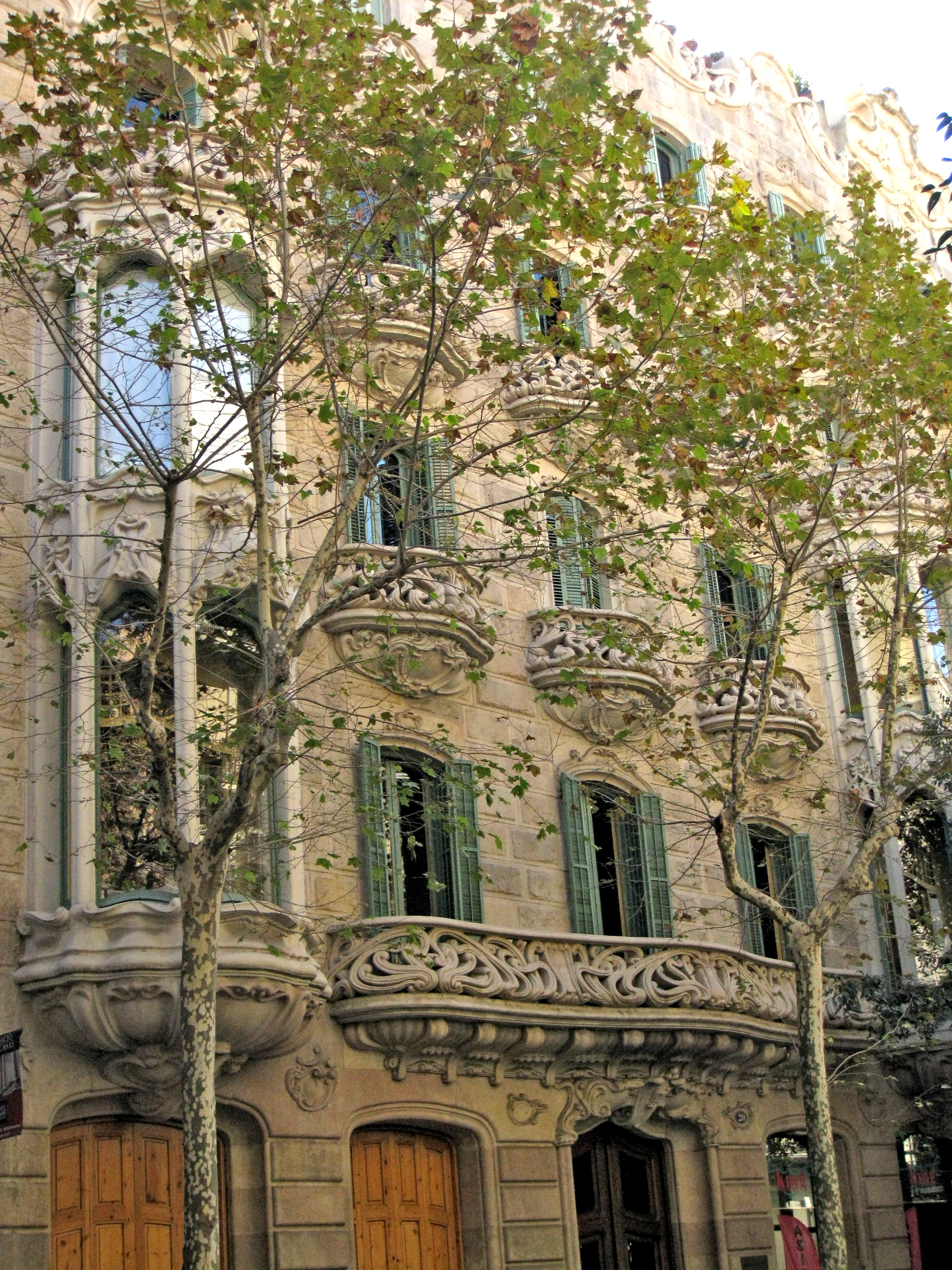
Casa Manual Felip, on Carrer Ausiàs Marc

Carrer d'Ausiàs Marc (Catalan pronunciation: [kəˈre ðəwziˈaz ˈmark], sometimes written as Ausiàs March, see the Pompeu Fabra article for more information on spelling) is a street in Eixample, Barcelona, named after the Valencian poet of the same name.

It is located between Carrer de Casp and Carrer d'Alí Bei, crossing Dreta de l'Eixample from Plaça Urquinaona towards Carrer de Lepant.

== Transport ==
=== Metro ===
- Urquinaona (L1, L4)

=== Bus lines ===
- Bus 10 Montbau - Pg. Marítim
- Bus 54 Estació del Nord - Campus Nord.
- Nitbus N9 Pl. Portal de la Pau - Tiana (Edith Llaurador)

== Education and culture ==
=== Schools ===
- IES Fort Pius
- Escola Mireia

=== Libraries ===
- Associació Orquestra de Cambra d'Amics dels Clàssics library.

== Religious services ==
=== Catholic churches ===
- Església Conventual Mare de Déu del Rosari

== See also ==
- List of streets and squares in Eixample
