= María Josefa Massanés =

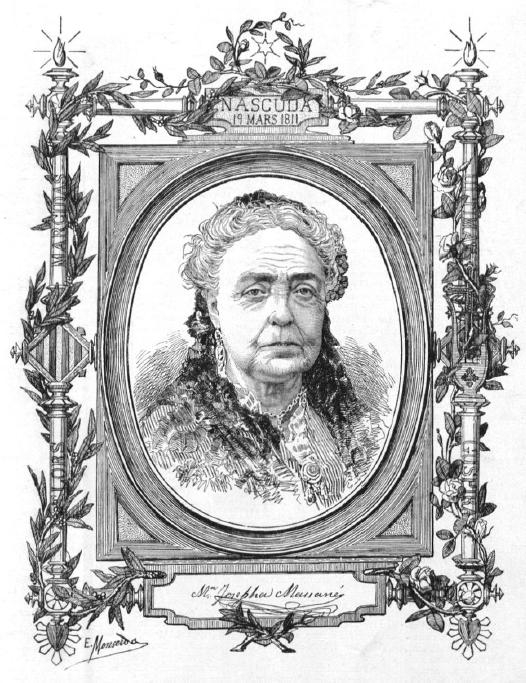
Maria Josepa Massanés i Dalmau in 1879

Maria Josepa Massanés (1811-1887) was a Spanish poet. The poetic work of Massanés is characterized by the diversity of themes, love, homeland, religion, social criticism, the situation of women, as well as the precise formal richness.

Massanés is associated with Romantic poetry. She wrote in the Spanish and Catalan languages.

== Early life ==
She was the daughter of Francisca Dalmau i José Massanés, who was a writer, architect, urban planner, and military man. It is very possible that she inherited her father's passion for knowledge, his love for his own land and his religious sense.

From the poet's family life, it is worth mentioning that her family lived immersed in the War of Independence, since when she was two months old, her whole family moved to Barcelona thanks to her father's military occupations (he fought against the Napoleonic invading army). However, when the poet was five years old, her mother died, leaving her in the care of her paternal grandparents, who were people of deep-rooted customs and patriarchal thinking, so they did not make it easy for María Josefa Massanés when she showed interest in studying. On the other hand, her father supported her in her intellectual formation and encouraged her in her literary inclination. The poet, together with her grandmother, dedicated herself to the activity of embroidery to make ends meet, which did not prevent her from reading as much as she could, which did not prevent her from learning French, Latin, and Italian. In 1830, the life of the future poet took a dramatic turn when she had to help her father flee to France after being condemned to death by Charles of Spain, 1st Count of Spain, Captain General of Catalonia (Carlos de España, I conde de España, capitán general de Cataluña). In 1833, José Massanés was able to return from exile through a pardon after the death of Ferdinand VII (Fernando VII). After this, the future poet had a much quieter life with her father, and it was at this time that she began to write her first poems. Only five years later she had already become an important literary figure in her area.

== First works ==
In 1834, in the newspaper El Vapor (September 11) appeared a poem published without a title, it is only read at the bottom of the poem "verses of D.B.C.A.". In the same newspaper, a sonnet called La Sospecha and Una Letrilla appeared published on December 23.

It was not until ten months later that the poet began to publish already with her initials (J.M.), the poem Himno Guerrero (also published in El Vapor, on September 25, 1835), which addressed political and territorial issues, both considered at the time properly masculine matters. In El Nuevo Vapor (December 27, 1836) the poem María was published, in which appears an apostille in which the mystery of her name is solved and pointed out the true authorship of the previous poems published in El Vapor. The poem that follows these in chronological order is A la incomparable doña Matilde Diez de Romea, already signed with her full name.

Newspapers such as El Guardia Nacional and La Religión published his poems between 1837 and 1840, which were very well received by the critics. Of these publications it is worth mentioning La oración de la mañana (El Guardia Nacional, October 19, 1837), A mi prima Isabel (El Guardia Nacional, December 24, 1837, Noticioso de Ambos Mundos, April 7, 1838), El genio (El Guardia Nacional, September 20, 1838, Noticioso de Ambos Mundos, February 2, 1839), Al Criador (El Guardia Nacional, November 15, 1838, La Religión, t. IV, 1838), and Un beso personal (Noticioso de Ambos Mundos, January 6, 1838). All of them were translated into English, being recommended by the Government of the United States for the North American primary schools.

The great reception and social response to these first poems earned María Josefa Massanés the official appointment of resident member of the Philodramatic Society of Barcelona (Sociedad Filodramática de Barcelona), in 1837, and as honorary member of the Academy of Good Letters of Barcelona (Academia de Buenas Letras de Barcelona) in 1838.

== Stay in Madrid ==
In January 1843 she married Infantry Captain Fernando González de Ortega. Due to her husband's destiny, they resided in Madrid between 1843 and 1844, a period that allowed her to become known in the circles of the Court. In 1844, she was appointed a member of the Liceo Artístico-Literario de Madrid.

In Madrid she experienced wrote a number of works, including La voz de Dios (El Reflejo, March 9, 1843), Oh padre mío! (El Heraldo, September 18, 1844, El Imparcial, September 26, 1844), paradigmatic poems such as in the Semanario Pintoresco Español (1843), La Verdad (1844), as well as in La Civilización (1842) and Almacén de Frutos Literarios (1843, 1844).

In 1844 the couple returned to Barcelona, where he was an important member of a literary circle and resumed the cultural life of Barcelona as a personage of importance and this fact increased with the publication of A S.A.R. el esclarecido Duque de Montpensier por su feliz enlace con S.A. Serenísima la Infanta de España, Doña Luisa Fernanda de Borbón (1846).

== Outstanding works ==
- Poesías (1841) (Barcelona: Imprenta de J. Rubio, 1841): an enriched work that includes a personal prologue in which she exposes the situation of women and their relationship with education and their access to letters. In short, it defends the extension of public education to the female sex. This first installment was so successful that it prompted a second edition 20 years after the death of María Josefa Massanés.
- Flores Marchitas. Nueva Colección de poesías (Barcelona: Imprenta de A. Brusi, 1850): a collection of poems with historical and religious themes. Thanks to its solvency in the different registers and its precision in the form, it was acclaimed by the critical articles of the time.
- Descenso de la Stma. Virgen a Barcelona para la fundación de la Orden de la Merced y Misericordia (Barcelona: Tipografía de Narciso Ramírez y Rialp, 1862). It is a lyrical-sacred drama, accompanied by the score of Bernardo Calvó Puig. The action is set in the first days of August 1218 and is in the Palace of the Counts of Barcelona and Kings of Aragon. It is known that the poet wrote other religious works, however, only this one has survived.
- Garlanda poética ilerdanesa (Lleida: Josep Sol y Torréns, 1881), written in collaboration with J. Martí y Folguero and A. Guimerá.
- Importancia de la perfecció dels brodats (Barcelona: Imprenta de la Renaixensa, 1881).

== Works in Catalan ==
In 1858, following the steps previously taken by some authors such as Rubió y Ors, V. Balaguer, V. Amer, among others, they worked in favour of the Catalan idea and the writing of literature in Catalan. All this culminated, to a large extent, with the restitution of the Floral Games (Juegos Florales) (1858). Massanés contributed directly to this movement by writing and publishing poems in her mother tongue. Her first publication in Catalan began with the collection formed by Antonio de Bofarull Los Trobadòrs nous (1858), in which Als meus estimats fillets adoptius. La Flor del cel and Lo postrér Consol. The following year he appears in Los Trovadors moderns (1859) with the poems Las donas catalanas and La Creu del terme. From this date until her death, she continued her creative work in parallel, using both languages, and publishing in both Spanish and Catalan press and magazines.

One work worth mentioning is La roja barretina catalana (1880), included in the booklet Respirall de la colecció de poesias catalanas titled Darreras Guspiras (1879), which includes some of her creations in Catalan. After her death, Poesíes (1908) was published, which gathers a good part of his Catalan poetic production.

In 1864, she received the extraordinary prize for Creurer és viurer at the Jochs Florals. La roja barretina catalana and Castas espinas were praised and translated by J. Fastenrath (1890). At the same time he published Descenso de la Santísima Virgen a Barcelona, para la fundacion de la orden de la Merced y Misericordia

== Last years ==
After some years, specifically in 1877, Massanés resumed some of her literary activities after founding in 1869 a school for young ladies as a lifeline for her family, since political events left them in a precarious situation. However, the death of her husband, Fernando González de Ortega, led to the closing of the school in 1872.

The author's third poetic stage is gathered in an unpublished form in the book Frutos de otoño (Autumn Fruits). In her poems her social concern and her concern for the education of women is evident.
