= Ronda de la Universitat, Barcelona =

Street in Barcelona, Spain

Coordinates: 41.3867°N 2.1669°E

Ronda de la Universitat is a major thoroughfare of central Barcelona, Catalonia, Spain, in lower side of the Dreta de l'Eixample, in the Eixample district. It links two of the city's three main squares, running from Plaça de Catalunya towards Plaça Universitat. There it meets Gran Via de les Corts Catalanes and Ronda de Sant Antoni begins. It's essentially the same street as Ronda de Sant Pere, which follows it right after Plaça de Catalunya. As the other ronda, it follows the original outline of the medieval city walls, particularly the wall of Tallers, above the area nowadays known as Raval, where a road called Carrer de Tallers runs partially parallel to it. Ronda de la Universitat was paved in 1872. It takes its name from the Universitat de Barcelona, which has had its main building at Plaça Universitat since the 19th century. Before its current name was approved in 1989, its official name was in Spanish: Universidad. The Biblioteca Judicial de Catalunya is on this street.

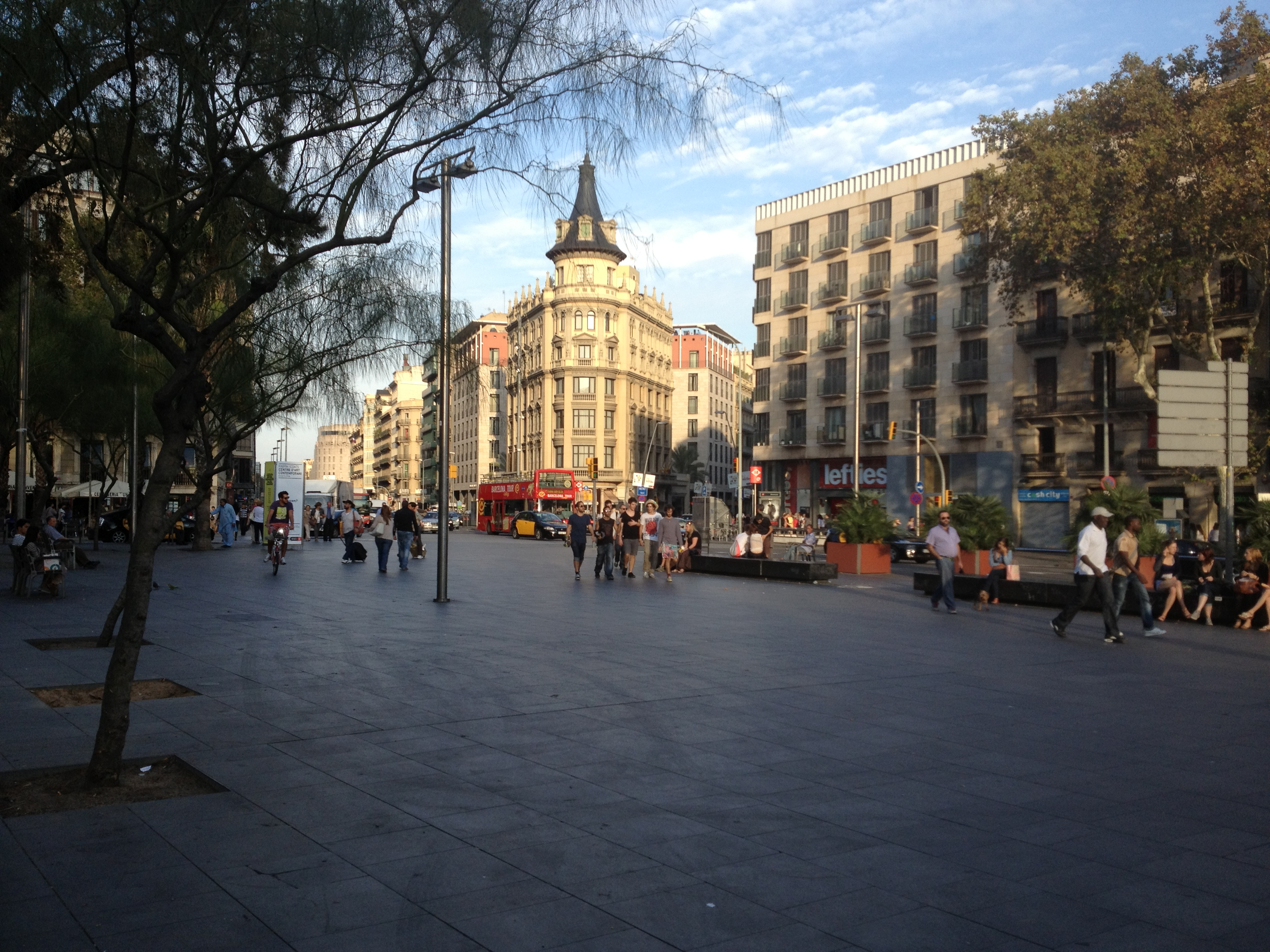
Ronda de la Universitat as seen from Plaça Universitat

== Transport ==
- Barcelona Metro stations Universitat (on L1 and L2. Catalunya, on lines L1 and L3, as well as FGC-operated metro lines L6 and L7 and other metropolitan lines, as well of several Renfe-operated commuter services.

== See also ==
- List of streets and squares in Eixample, Barcelona
- Urban planning of Barcelona
