= Ronda de Sant Pere =

Street in Barcelona

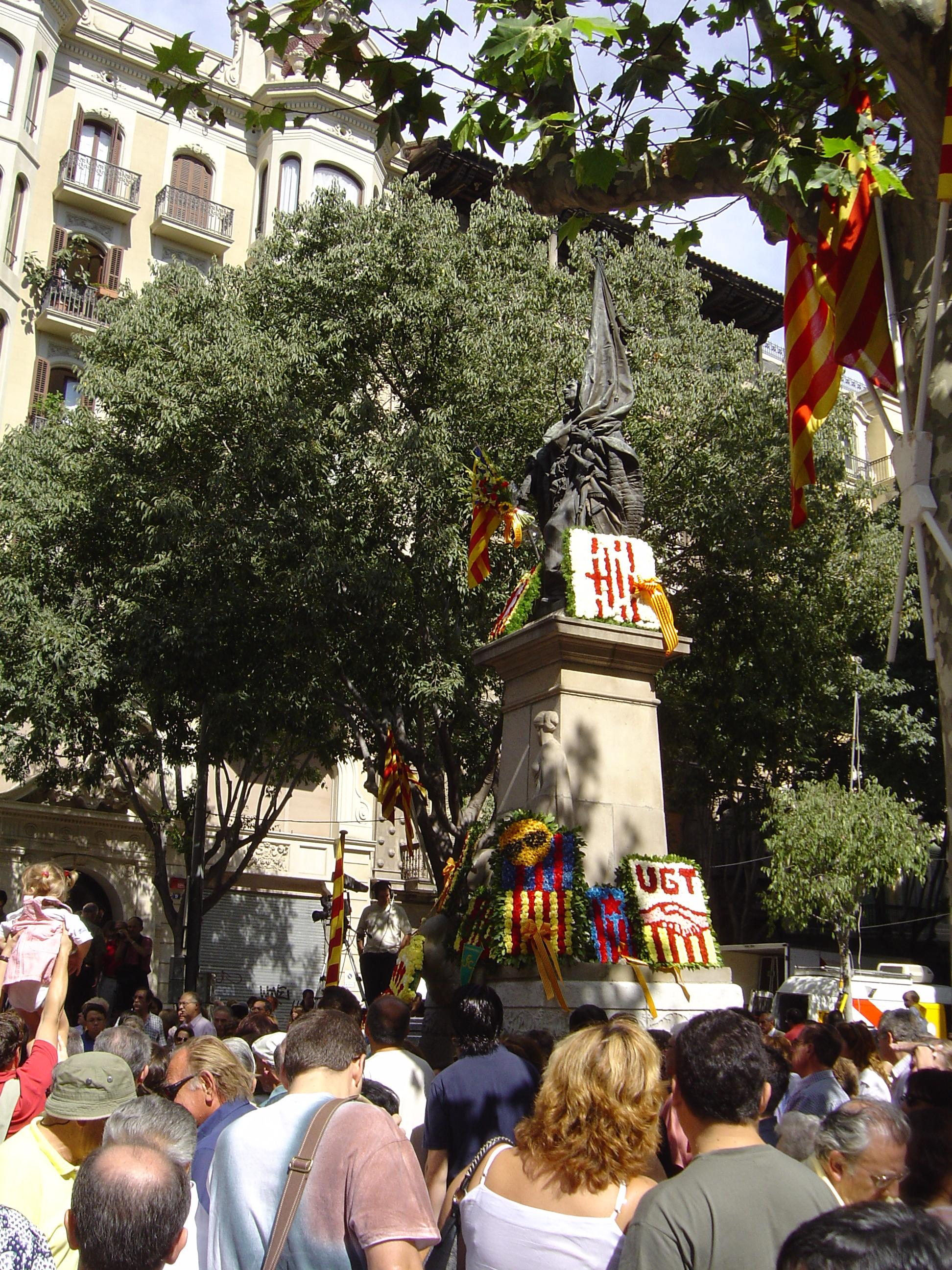
Rafael Casanova monument on Ronda de Sant Pere during a September 11 celebration.

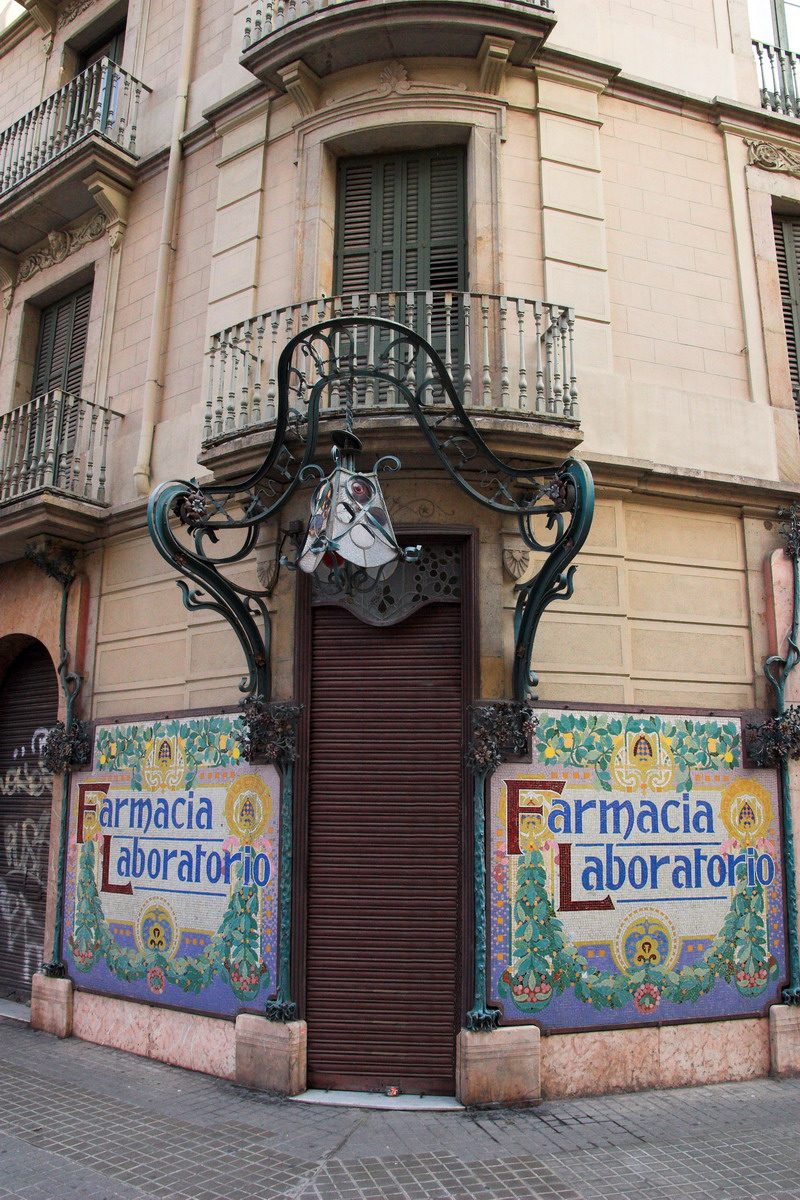
Art Nouveau façade of Farmàcia Vilador, by Fèlix Cardellach. Only part of its metal ornaments remain.

Ronda de Sant Pere is a thoroughfare in central Barcelona, Catalonia, Spain, one of the main roads in the lower side of Dreta de l'Eixample, part of the Eixample district. It runs from the Arc de Triomf, in Passeig de Lluís Companys, through Plaça Urquinaona towards Plaça de Catalunya, where the medieval city walls stood before the construction of Eixample. After Plaça de Catalunya it becomes Ronda de la Universitat.

It features the famous Rafael Casanova i Comes monument, built in 1888 by Rossend Nobas, Josep Llimona and Alexandre Soler March for the Expo of that year, commemorating the Catalan leader who defended Barcelona during the Spanish War of Succession in the early 18th century. Several days every year, most notably on the National Day of Catalonia (September 11) and St George's Day (April 23), flower offerings take place by the statue.

The street is named after the neighbourhood of Sant Pere (Saint Peter), part of the Ciutat Vella district, located immediately below it, and the Monastery of Sant Pere de les Puel·les. Other streets in the area named after the saint include Carrer de Sant Pere més Alt, Carrer de Sant Pere Mitjà, Carrer de Sant Pere més Baix.

== Transport ==
- Barcelona Metro stations Arc de Triomf, Urquinaona (both on line L1 and Catalunya (on L1 and L3. The latter also includes a FGC-operated station including metro lines L6 and L7 and several other metropolitan railway lines.
- Arc de Triomf railway station, operated by Renfe.

== See also ==
- List of streets and squares in Eixample, Barcelona
- Ronda de la Universitat
- Urban planning of Barcelona
