= Plaça de la Universitat, Barcelona =

Square in Barcelona, Spain

Coordinates: 41.385644°N 2.164048°E

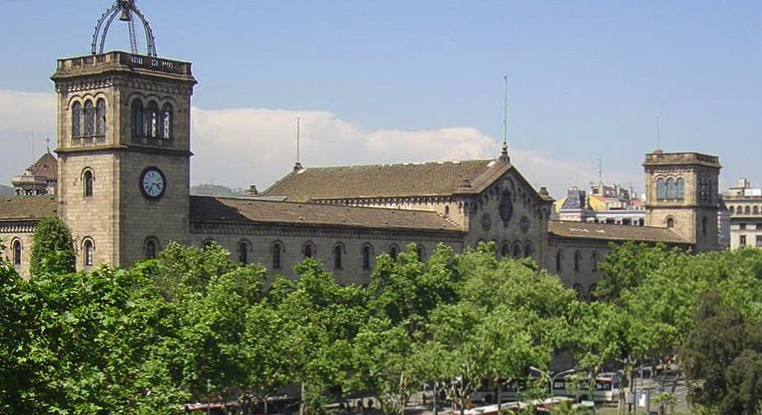
The UB campus on Plaça Universitat.

The Plaça de la Universitat (Catalan pronunciation: [ˈplasə ðə lə uniβərsiˈtat], official Catalan-language name since 1980; Spanish: Plaza de la Universidad) is one of Barcelona's central squares, at the border between the districts of Eixample and Ciutat Vella. It is located at the intersection of Gran Via de les Corts Catalanes, Carrer d'Aribau and Ronda de Sant Antoni. It is also just west of Plaça de Catalunya, to which it is linked by the Ronda de la Universitat and Carrer de Pelai.

The plaza is named for the University of Barcelona, whose neo-Gothic main campus lies on its northwest side. The main University building was built between 1863 and 1889 by the architect Elies Rogent, who also devised the square in 1874, at the time when the Eixample was being built after the complete demolition of the city walls. Along with Plaça d'Urquinaona, it is arguably one of the most common gathering-places for demonstrations in the city, as well as offering a pedestrianised area popular with skaters. There square is also surrounded by a number of shops and restaurants, and a primary school.

== Transport ==
Universitat metro station is located on the square and it is served by Barcelona Metro line 1 and line 2.

== See also ==
- Urban planning of Barcelona

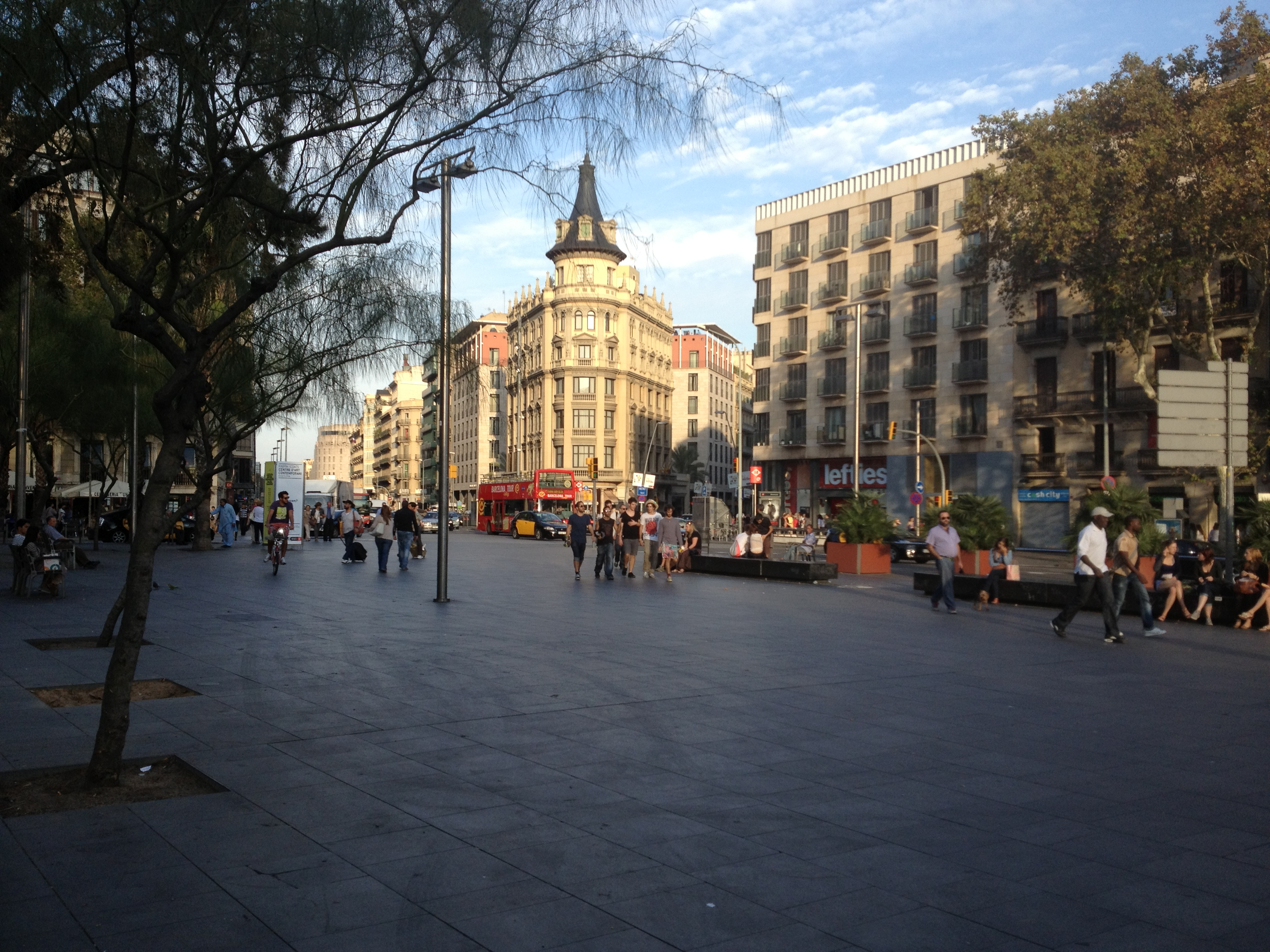
Ronda de la Universitat as seen from Plaça Universitat
