= Carrer de Roger de Llúria, Barcelona =

Street in Barcelona

Coordinates: 41.3943°N 2.1673°E

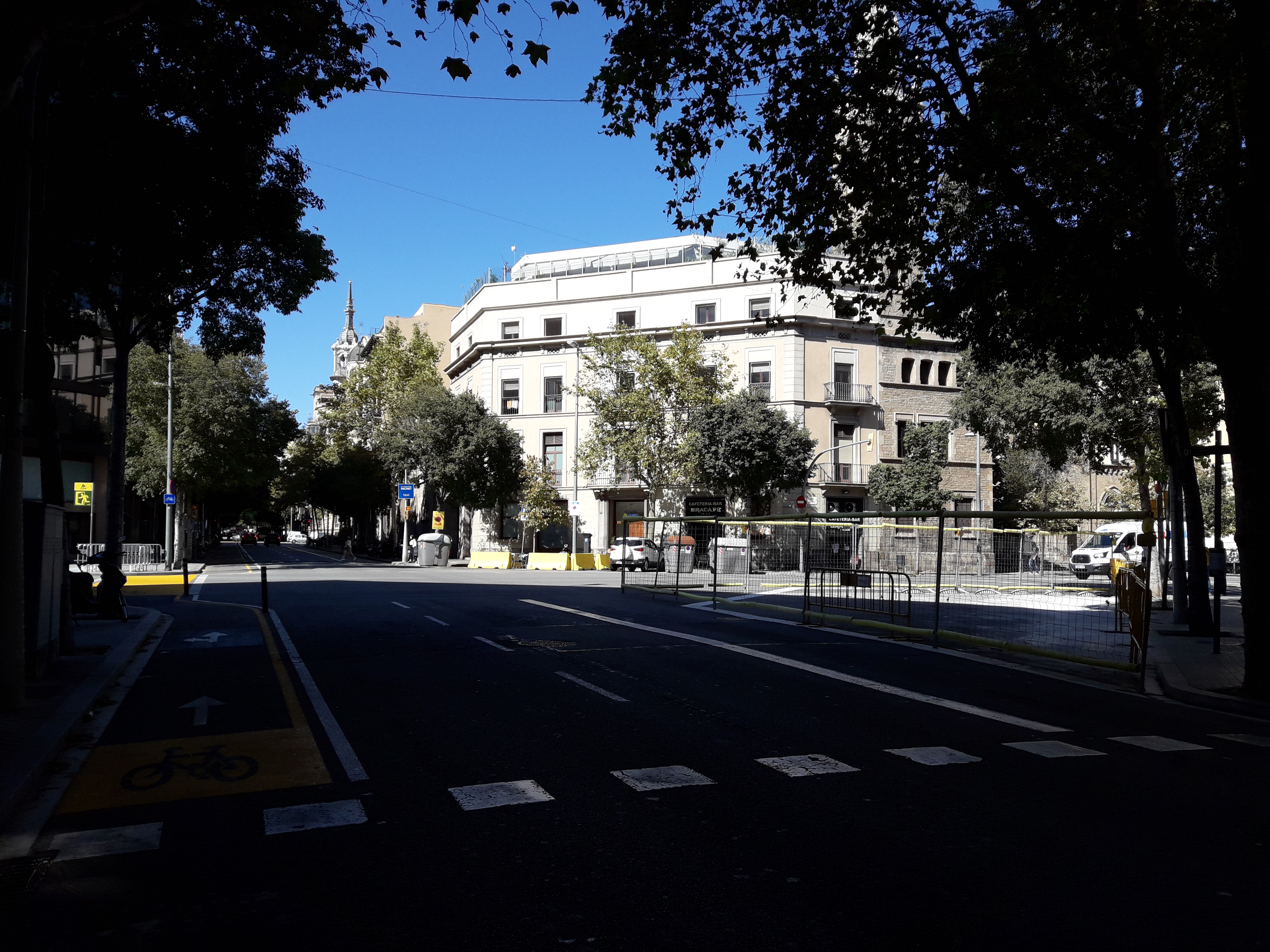
The road Carrer Roger de llúria

Carrer de Roger de Llúria is a street in central Barcelona, in the Eixample district, named after Roger of Lauria. It starts in Carrer de Còrsega and ends in Plaça Urquinaona and is located between Carrer de Pau Claris and Carrer del Bruc, in Dreta de l'Eixample.

== Buildings and sites of interest ==
- Cases Cerdà (1864) by Antoni Valls, Modernista buildings, among the oldest in Barcelona.
- Jardins de la Torre de les Aigües
- Passatge Permanyer, an alley where the musician Rafael Vidiella and the writer Apel·les Mestres lived.
- Il·lustre Col·legi d'Advocats de Barcelona

== Transport ==
=== Metro ===
- Urquinaona (L1, L4)

=== Bus ===
- Line 6 Pg. Manuel Girona - Poblenou
- Line 15 Hospital de Sant Pau - Collblanc
- Line 33 Zona Universitària - Verneda
- Line 34 Sarrià - Virrei Amat
- Line 39 Barceloneta - Horta
- Line 45 Pg. Marítim - Horta
- Line 47 Pl. Catalunya - Canyelles
- Line B20 Barcelona (Rda. Sant Pere) - Sta. Coloma (Oliveres)
- Line B21 Barcelona (Rda. Sant Pere) - Sta. Coloma (Av. Ramon Berenguer IV)
- Line B24 Barcelona (Rda. Sant Pere) - Badalona (H. Can Ruti)

== See also ==
- List of streets and squares in Eixample
