= Plaça de Catalunya =

Public square in Barcelona, Spain

Coordinates: 41°23′12″N 2°10′12″E

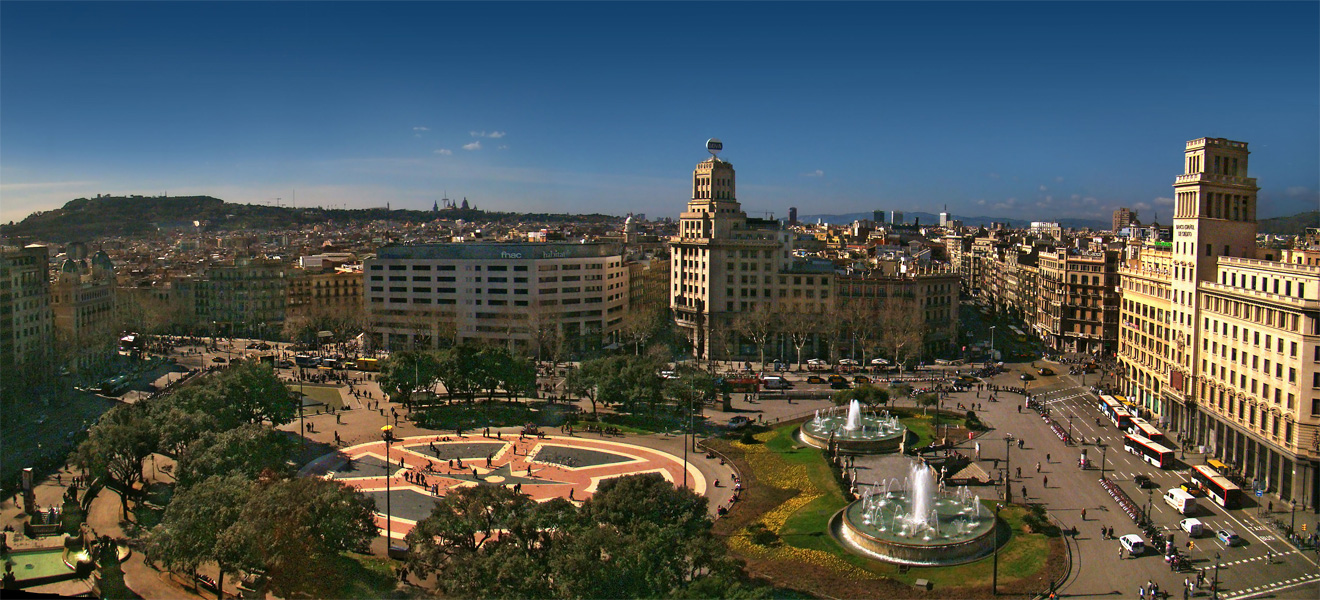
Plaça de Catalunya

Plaça de Catalunya (pronounced [ˈplasə ðə kətəˈluɲə], meaning in English "Catalonia Square"; sometimes referred to as Plaza de Cataluña, its Spanish name) is a large square in central Barcelona that is generally considered to be both its city centre and the place where the old city (see Barri Gòtic and Raval, in Ciutat Vella) and the 19th century-built Eixample meet.

The plaza is especially known for its fountains and statues, the central compass rose (or "wind rose") on the pavement, its proximity to some of Barcelona's most popular attractions, and the flocks of pigeons that gather in the centre. Some of the city's most important streets and avenues meet at Plaça Catalunya: Passeig de Gràcia, Rambla de Catalunya, La Rambla, and Portal de l'Àngel, in addition to Ronda de Sant Pere, Carrer de Vergara, and Carrer de Pelai. The plaza occupies an area of about 50,000 square metres. The square played a significant part in the Spanish Civil War, in particular as a site of key events of the May Days.

== History ==
After the medieval city walls were demolished in the 19th century, ambitious designs for the city's public spaces were conceived under the guidance of notable urban planners. Plaça Catalunya was conceived as part of pla Rovira in 1859, but no official permission from the government was given until the 1888 Universal Exposition. It was urbanised for the first time in 1902 and was further modified in 1929, on the occasion of the 1929 Barcelona International Exposition, which also included the construction of a metro station. Architect Francesc de Paula Nebot designed the changes made in 1929.

In May 2011 Plaça Catalunya was the main location where anti-government protests and sit ins were held in Barcelona, mirroring the events in other Spanish cities.

== Art ==
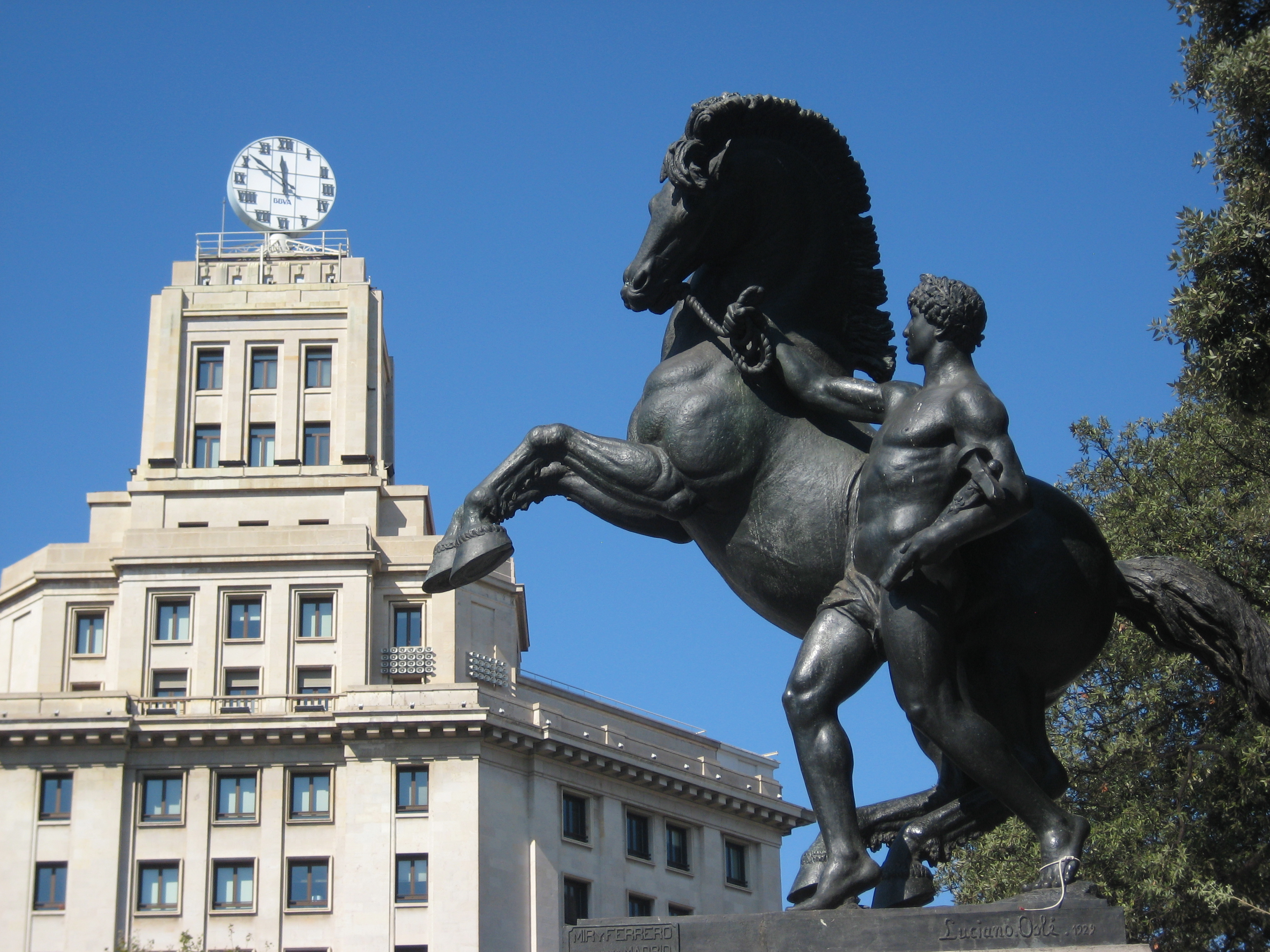
A Neoclassical equestrian statue

=== Sculpture ===
Plaça Catalunya is the site of several notable public sculptures and monuments representative of Noucentisme, Neo-Classicism and different avant-garde movements.

- Deessa, by Josep Clarà.
- Pastor de Pau, by Pablo Gargallo.
- Francesc Macià monument. The inscription reads: "Catalunya a Francesc Macià".
- Josep Llimona's sculptures.

=== Decorative arts ===
The Barcelona Telephone Exchange (Edificio Telefónica) has four stained glass windows, designed in 1991, installed in the tower lantern. Commissioned from the artist Brian Clarke to commemorate the 1992 Olympic Games hosted by the city, the artworks were fabricated by the local Fundació Centre del Vidre, and conceived to function as a coloured beacon overlooking the square.

The mosaics that decorate the walls of the underground part of Plaça Catalunya were designed by pupils of Escola Massana.

== Culture ==
=== Theatre ===
A few theatres have been established in Plaça Catalunya since its construction, none of which are extant.

- Teatre del Bon Retir (1876-1885)
- Circ Eqüestre Alegria (1879-1895)
- Eldorado Concert (1887-1929)
- Teatre Barcelona (1923-198-)

There still are, however, other theatres in the nearby area, located in other streets or squares.

=== Cafés and restaurants ===
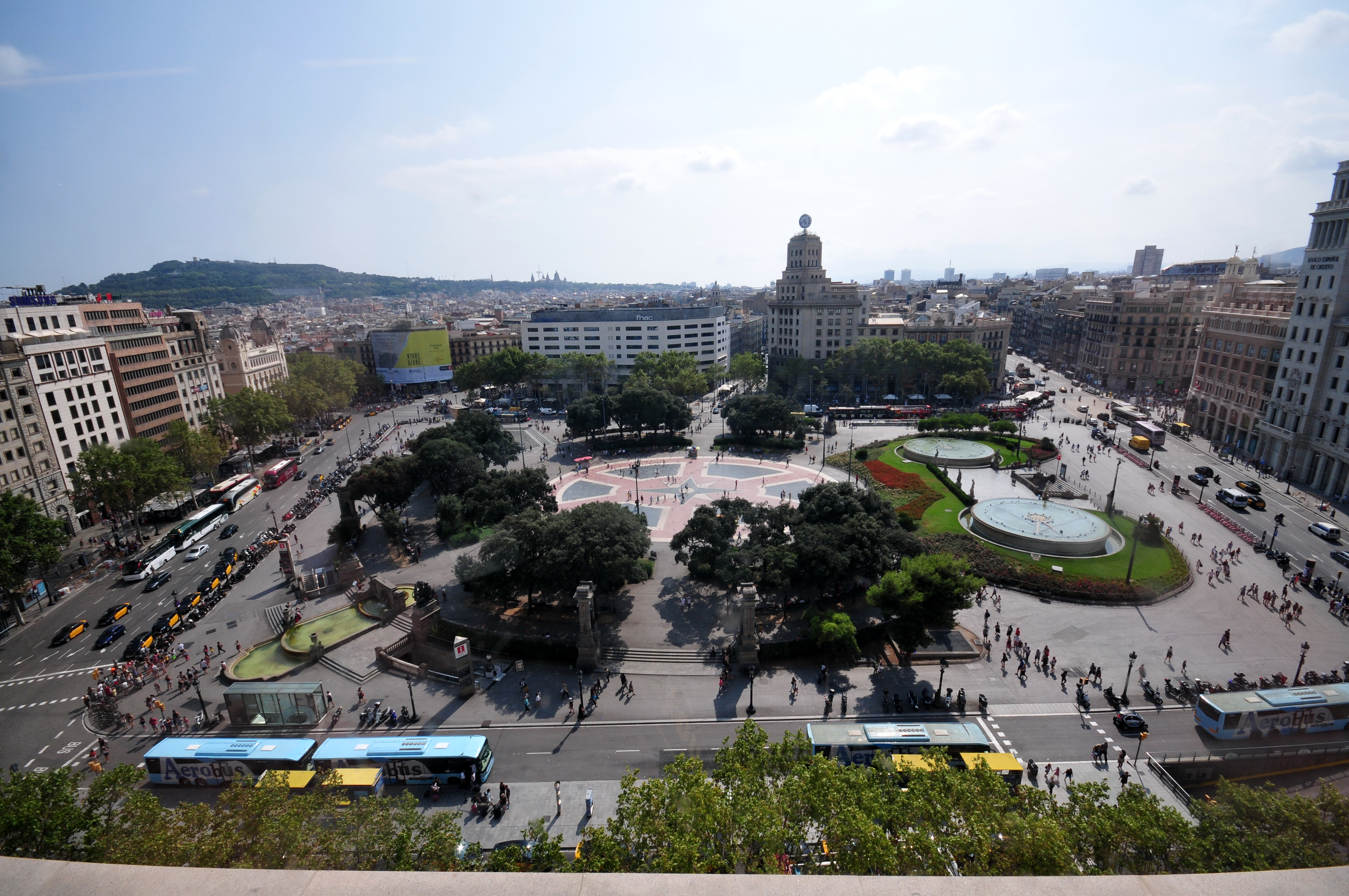
The square in August 2014

Similarly, most of the cafés and restaurants where writers and artists would meet in the city haven't survived, with the notable exception of Café Zurich, where Fabiola of Belgium's brother worked as a pianist. The following ones disappeared with the Spanish Civil War:

- Maison Dorée
- Café Colón
- La Lluna
- Cafè Suís

== Other services ==
=== Shopping centres ===
- El Corte Inglés
- El Triangle, containing a three-story fnac shop.
- Sfera

=== Hotels ===
- H10 Catalunya Plaza
- Hotel Monegal
- Olivia Plaza Hotel
- Hotel Urquinaona

=== Financial institutions ===
- Banco Español de Crédito (Banesto).
- Banco Bilbao Vizcaya Argentaria (BBVA).
- Banco de España
- Caja Madrid

=== Foreign relations ===
- Consulate of Canada, Second Floor, 9 Plaça de Catalunya.

== Transport ==
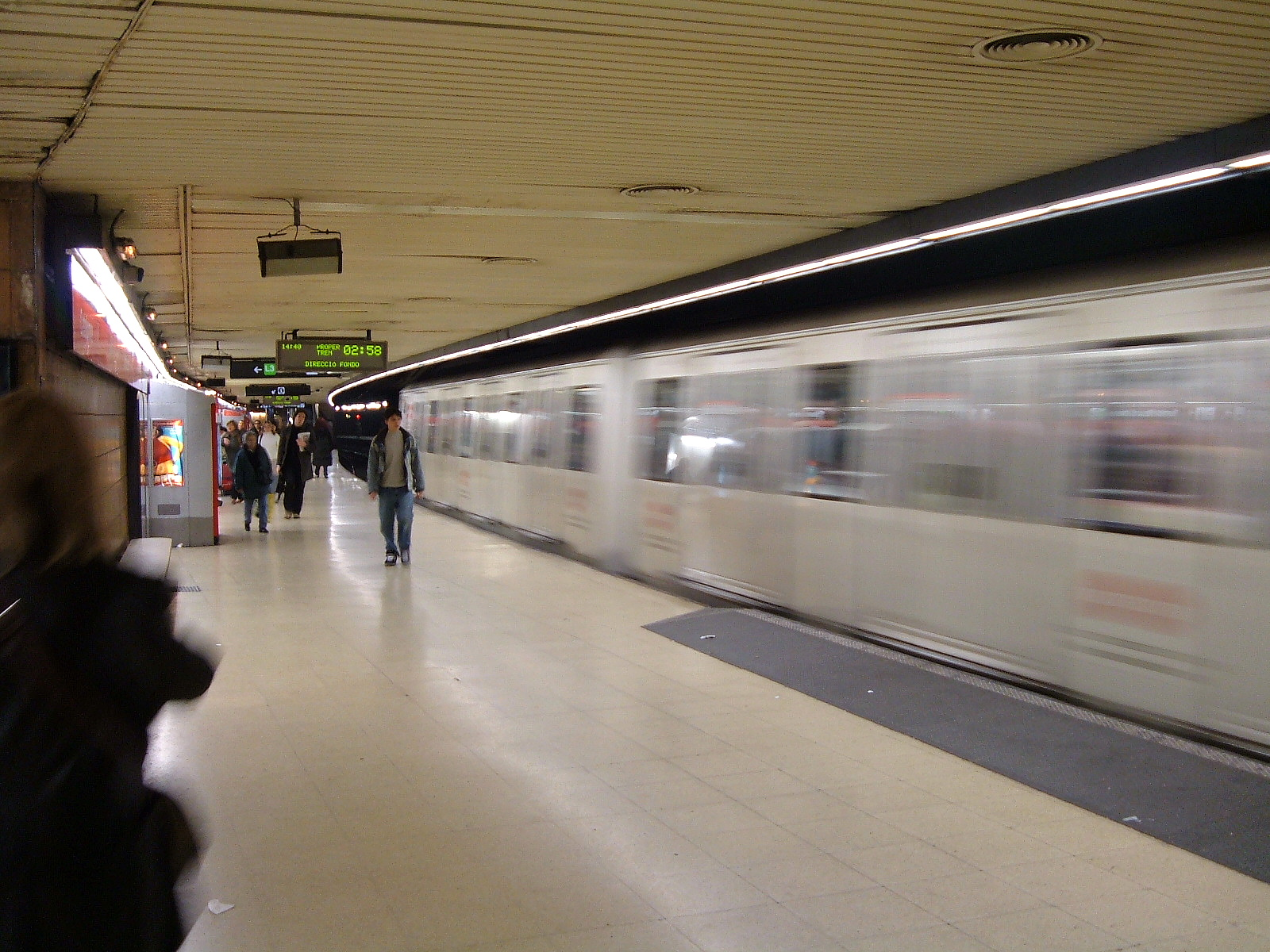
Catalunya metro station.

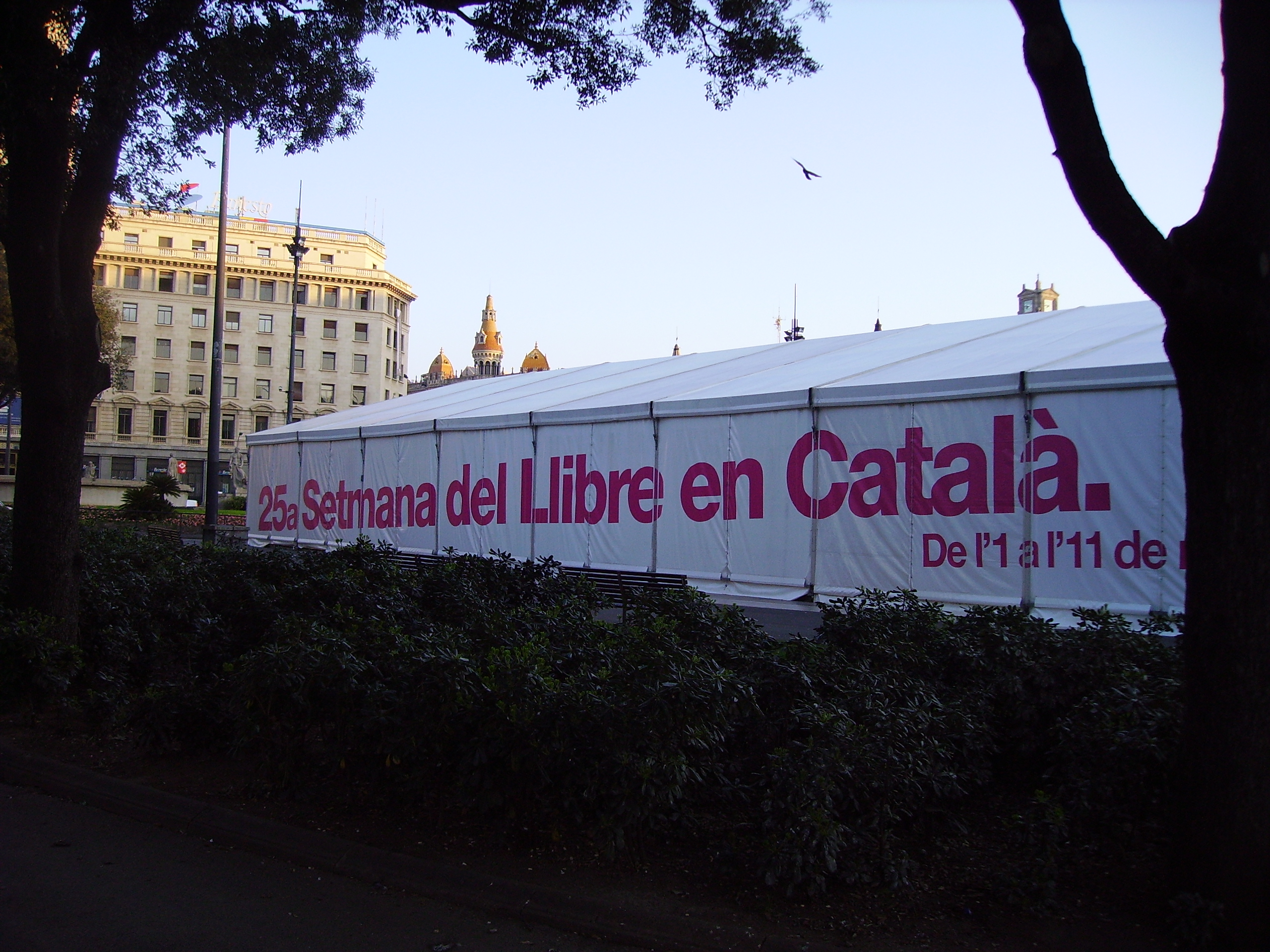
Setmana del Llibre en Català event held in the square.

The square is one of Barcelona's most important transport hubs, both above and under ground.

=== Metro ===
The original Barcelona metro line in Barcelona, known as Gran Metro, had Plaça Catalunya as one of its termini. It went to become the current green line, L3, operated by TMB. It's also served by two FGC lines.

- Catalunya (L1, L3, L6, L7)
- Passeig de Gràcia (L2, L3, L4).

=== Bus lines ===
==== Day bus ====
- Bus 9 Pl. Catalunya - Pg. Zona Franca
- Bus 14 Vil·la Olímpica - Pg. Bonanova
- Bus 16 Urquinaona - Pg. Manuel Girona
- Bus 17 Barceloneta - Av. Jordà
- Bus 24 Av. Paral·lel - Carmel
- Bus 28 Pl. Catalunya - Carmel
- Bus 41 Pl. Francesc Macià - Diagonal Mar
- Bus 42 Pl. Catalunya - Santa Coloma
- Bus 55 Parc de Montjuïc - Plaça Catalana
- Bus 58 Pl. Catalunya - Av. Tibidabo
- Bus 59 Pg. Marítim - Plaça Reina Maria Cristina
- Bus 66 Pl. Catalunya - Sarrià
- Bus 67 Pl. Catalunya - Cornellà
- Bus 68 Pl. Catalunya - Cornellà
- Bus 141 Av. Mistral - Barri del Besòs
- Aerobus
- Liyver

==== Nitbus ====
Barcelona's night bus is known as Nitbus and most of its lines serve Plaça Catalunya:

- N1 Zona Franca (Mercabarna) - Pl. Catalunya - Roquetes (Aiguablava)
- N2 Av. Carrilet - Pl. Catalunya - Badalona (Montigalà)
- N3 Collblanc - Montcada i Reixac
- N4 Via Favència - Pl. Catalunya - Gran Vista
- N5 Pl. Catalunya - Gran Vista
- N6 Barcelona (Roquetes) - Santa Coloma (Oliveres)
- N7 Pl. Pedralbes - Pl. Llevant (Fòrum)
- N8 Can Caralleu - Santa Coloma (Can Franquesa)
- N9 Pl. Portal de la Pau - Tiana (Edith Llaurador)
- N11 Barcelona (Pl. Catalunya) - H. Can Ruti
- N12
- N13
- N14
- N15
- N16
- N17
- N18
- N20
- N28

=== Train ===
- Barcelona Plaça Catalunya railway station

== In popular culture ==
Plaça de Catalunya is a featured locale in the 2009 video game Wheelman, published by Midway Games.

== See also ==
- Avinguda de la Llum
- Font de Canaletes
- History of Barcelona
- List of streets and squares in Eixample
- Street names in Barcelona
- Urban planning of Barcelona
- Sculptures in Plaça de Catalunya

== References and external links ==
- ALBAREDA, Joaquim, GUÀRDIA, Manel i altres. Enciclopèdia de Barcelona, Gran Enciclopèdia Catalana, Barcelona, 2006.
- City map at Bcn.es
- 360° panoramic view
