= El Triangle =

Spanish periodical

El Triangle is a weekly general information magazine published from Barcelona, Spain, specializing in investigative journalism. It was founded by the journalist Jaume Reixach in 1990. The average paper circulation is 10,000 copies.

The magazine has uncovered numerous cases of political and economic corruption and it is characterised by publishing exclusive information. El Triangle is credited for unveiling the many cases of corruption related to Convergencia, the party that ruled Catalonia for more than 28 years, and its founder Jordi Pujol and his family.

Politically, El Triangle has been close to blaverism.

El Triangle is published in Catalan and Spanish, with Spanish being its major editorial line.
