= Francesc Fontbona =

Spanish art historian, writer and exhibition curator

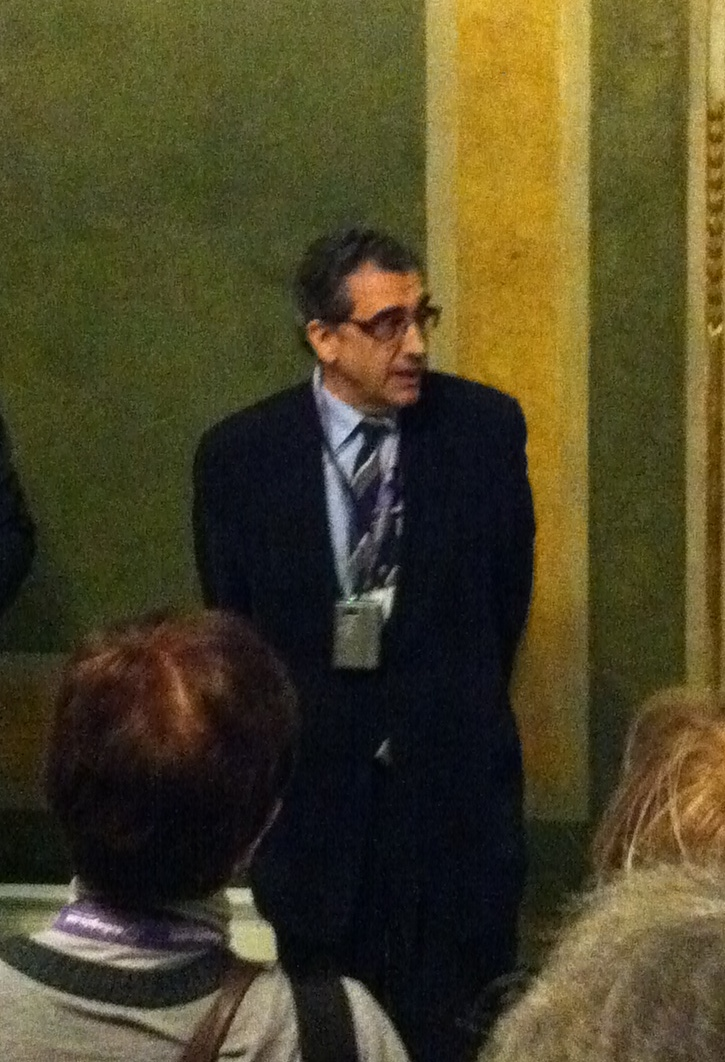
- Francesc Fontbona at Museu Picasso in Barcelona
- Born: Francesc Fontbona de Vallescar; July 20, 1948 (age 77); Barcelona
- Occupation: art historian

Francesc Fontbona de Vallescar (born 20 July 1948, in Barcelona) is a Catalan art historian, writer, exhibition curator and specialist in Romanticism, Catalan Modernism and Noucentisme Arts. Fontbona is the author of many works of Catalan art history. Doctorate in Early modern period from the Universitat de Barcelona in 1987. He was director of Graphic section in National Library of Catalonia (1995-2013), and Chief executive-writer of art section in the Great Catalan Encyclopedia (1968–78). Francesc Fontbona is member of the Royal Catalan Academy of Fine Arts of Saint George, member of The Hispanic Society of America, member of the Institut d’Estudis Catalans and Board chair of the Institut Amatller d'Art Hispànic.

== Notable books (selection) ==
- La crisi del Modernisme artístic. Barcelona: Curial, 1975.
- El paisatgisme a Catalunya. Barcelona: Edicions Destino, 1979.
- Anglada-Camarasa. Barcelona: Polígrafa, 1981. With Francesc Miralles.
- Del Neoclassicisme a la Restauració (1808-1888). Vol. VI de la Història de l'Art Català. Barcelona: Edicions 62, 1983.
- Del Modernisme al Noucentisme. Vol. VII de la Història de l'Art Català. Barcelona: Edicions 62, 1985. With F. Miralles.
- La xilografia a Catalunya entre 1800 i 1923. Barcelona: Biblioteca de Catalunya, 1992.
- L'Ottocento: dal neoclassicismo al realismo, in La pittura spagnola, edited by Alfonso E. Pérez Sanchez. Milano: Electa 1995.
- Catàleg del Museu de la Reial Acadèmia Catalana de Belles Arts de Sant Jordi (I-Pintura) Barcelona: Reial Acadèmia de Belles Arts de Sant Jordi, 1999. With Victoria Durá.
- Josep Mompou. Biografia i catàleg de la seva obra (pintura, gravat i tapís). Barcelona: Editorial Mediterrània, 2000.
- Gaudí al detall. El geni del Modernisme català. Barcelona: Pòrtic, 2002.
- Carles Mani, escultor maleït. Barcelona-Tarragona: Viena-Museu d'Art Modern de Tarragona, 2004.
- Francesc Torras Armengol 1832-1878. Barcelona: Caixa de Terrassa / Lunwerg, 2005.
- Pau Casals, col·leccionista d'art. Barcelona / Tarragona: Viena / Diputació de Tarragona, 2013.
- La Campana de Vidre (novel)
- Breu història de l'Art als Països Catalans . 2022

== Awards ==
- 1976 - Prize IEC for La crisi del Modernisme artístic
- 1977 - Prize “Crítica Serra d'Or” for La crisi del Modernisme artístic
- 1980 - Prize IEC for El paisatgisme a Catalunya
- 1984 – Honorable mention at awards to Catalan literature for Col·lecció d'Història de l'Art Català, Edicions 62.
- 1999 - Prize ACCA Best publication for Catàleg del Museu de la Reial Acadèmia de Belles Arts de Sant Jordi
- 2002 - Prize ACCA Best publication for El Modernisme
- 2015 - Prize ACCA Best publication for "Diccionari d'historiadors de l'art catalans, valencians i balears"
