= Plaça d'Urquinaona =

Coordinates: 41°23′22″N 2°10′24″E

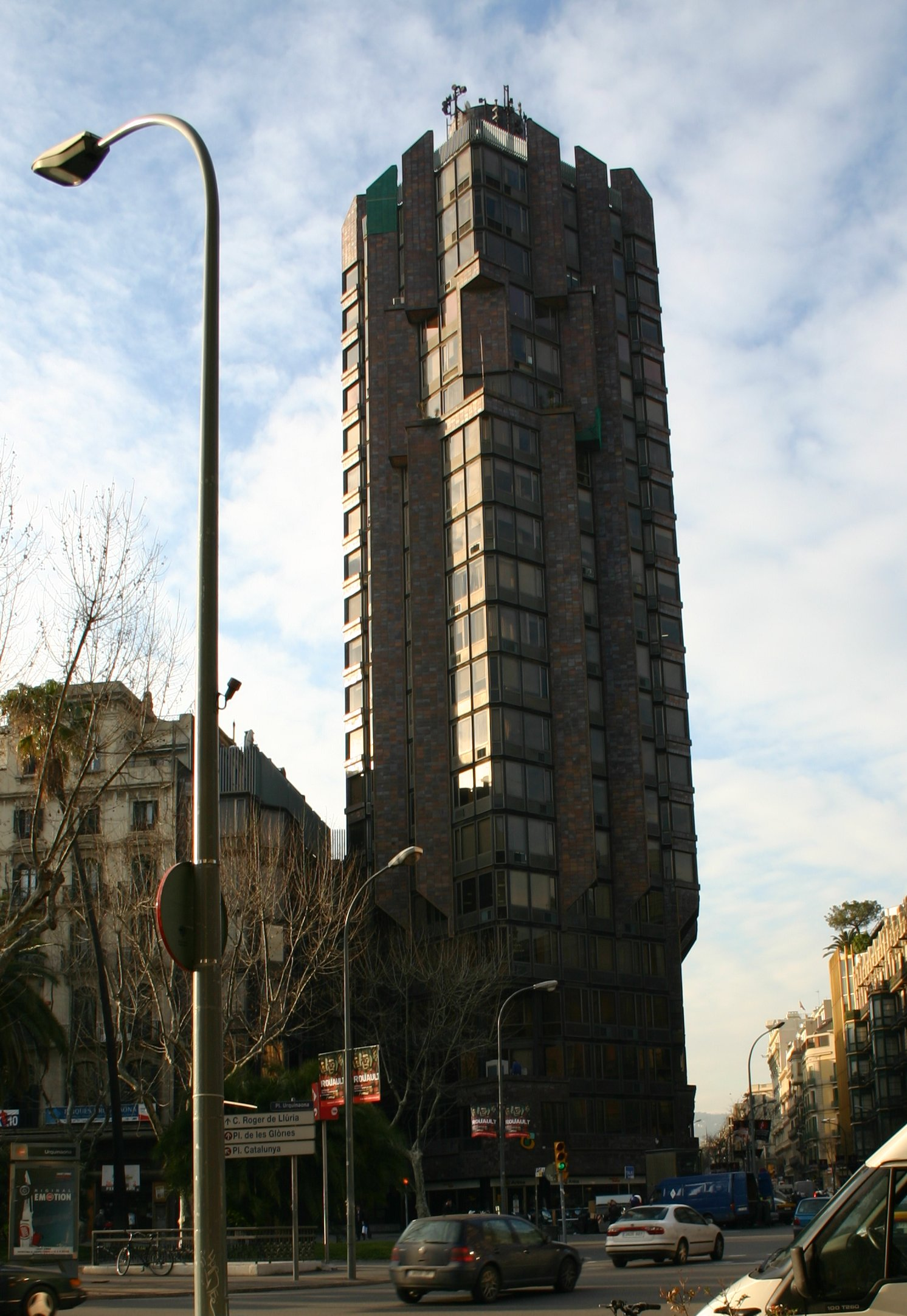
Torre Urquinaona.

The Plaça d'Urquinaona (Catalan pronunciation: [ˈplasə ðurkinəˈonə]) is one of the principal squares in central Barcelona. It is officially part of Dreta de l'Eixample neighbourhood, in the Eixample district, and is located at the intersection of the Ronda Sant Pere and Carrer d'Ausiàs Marc.

The square is traversed by a few major streets, including Carrer de Pau Claris, Via Laietana, and Carrer Roger de Llúria. Its urbanised surface amounts to 18,050 square meters, and has a green central area. It was named after José María de Urquinaona y Vidot, born in Cádiz and made bishop of Barcelona in 1878. The modern square is crowned by the Torre Urquinaona building, though it was created in 1857, after the demolition of the Sant Pere and Jonqueres bastions. It was originally named Plaça Nova de Jonqueres. Prior to the approval of the square's current name in 1980, it bore a number of other names, including Bisbe Urquinaona; Ferrer i Guàrdia, Francesc Ferrer i Guàrdia, Bisbe Urquinaona and Nova de Junqueres.

== Transport ==
- Barcelona Metro station Urquinaona, on lines L1 and L4.

== See also ==
- List of streets and squares in Eixample
- Urban planning of Barcelona
