= Grupo de Acción Republicana =

Spanish political association

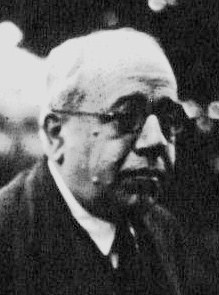
- Leader: Manuel Azaña
- Founded: 1925
- Dissolved: 1931
- Membership: Alianza Republicana
- Ideology: Republicanism
- Politics of Spain; Political parties; Elections; Transformation into the political party Acción Republicana (Spanish political party) – Acción Republicana

The Grupo de Acción Republicana (in English: Republican Action Group) —initially called Grupo de Acción Política (Political Action Group) and also known simply as Acción Republicana (Republican Action)— was a Spanish political group that emerged around 1925, during the dictatorship of Primo de Rivera. Its ideology consisted basically in the intention of replacing the monarchy of Alfonso XIII with a republican regime, while maintaining a great internal pluralism in other matters. It promoted the creation of the Republican Alliance to unite the different forces of this tendency, and supported on a secondary level the different pronunciamientos that tried to put an end to the Dictatorship. After the fall of Primo de Rivera, it participated in the attempts to form a unitary front that culminated in the Pact of San Sebastián. After the coalition thus formed failed in its attempt to end the monarchy by means of a military pronunciamiento, it participated in the Republican-Socialist Conjunction, a coalition that triumphed in the main cities in the municipal elections of April 1931, the result of which produced the proclamation of the Second Republic. It formed part of the first Provisional Government presided over by Alcalá-Zamora, in which its representative, the Minister of the Army Manuel Azaña, distinguished himself by promoting various reforms. Finally, at the end of May 1931, it became a political party under the name of Acción Republicana.

== Background ==
The political system of the Restoration had serious defects due to the distortion of the suffrage, the caciquismo and the interference of the king in the political struggle. However, it maintained the multiparty system and public liberties, and the existence of elections kept open a certain possibility of regeneration of the system. This changed with the coup d'état perpetrated by General Primo de Rivera. By liquidating the parliamentary system, he prevented any possibility of its evolution; and he did so with the consent of King Alfonso XIII.

Republicanism had long been a weak political movement. Its main representative, the Radical Republican Party of Alejandro Lerroux, had a diffuse structure based on small local parties. However, the political perspicacity of its leader allowed him to realize that it was necessary to undertake a reorganization work to receive the inheritance that the Dictatorship was going to leave to the movement. The reaction of the Reformist Party of Melquíades Álvarez was very different, as it failed to understand the significance of the political change and simply waited for the return of constitutional normality.

== Foundation ==
The Republican Action Group was born in 1925, when the dictatorship of Primo de Rivera had been in existence for a year and a half. Its first promoters were the pharmacist and professor of Biology José Giral and the lawyer and professor Enrique Martí Jara. Both were linked to the Escuela Nueva, a leftist cultural institution, and had been in correspondence with Miguel de Unamuno in 1924. In February of that year they announced to the writer that they wanted to form a "grouping, without dogma, of all or the healthiest part of Spanish politics". They began by holding what were called "novenas", that is, meetings of a maximum of nine people to avoid incurring in the crime of illegal meeting established by the Dictatorship. Martí incorporated Manuel Azaña, who had left the Reformist Party after the Primo de Rivera's pronunciamiento, to the meetings in Giral's backroom. At the beginning of 1925, they also had the assistance of the writer Ramón Pérez de Ayala, the criminal lawyer Luis Jiménez de Asúa and the physician Teófilo Hernando.

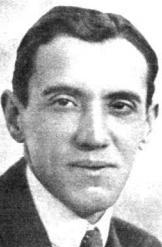
The writer Ramón Pérez de Ayala joined the group in 1925.

In May 1925, the group made public its founding manifesto, although the censorship of the Dictatorship prevented it from being published and circulated. It had been drafted by Azaña. The text expressed "all the rage of our liberal spirit, subjected to tyranny, and all the hope of our Spanish vigor, eager to redeem itself". It called for freedom, which he clearly identified with the Republic. Its purpose seemed to be to unite all Republicans, regardless of whether or not they were already members of any other organization. However, the group also expressed its desire to be an "embryo party" and called for the collaboration of the various republican and proletarian organizations. The text also defended the group's own identity, which did not wish to be confused with the discredited republican parties. It aspired rather to have a moral authority over the existing parties. It was not a political party and seemed to have the ambition of becoming a supra-party organization, as the Republican Alliance would later become. For the time being, membership of the group was perfectly compatible with membership of a public party. However, the manifesto did not reach thirty signatories.

Although some place the creation of the Republican Action Group at that time, the truth is that it was only known as "the group". Little by little it began to be called "political action group"; and then, with capital letters, "Political Action Group". Towards the end of December 1925, it was already called "Republican Action Group". During that year, it had no organization, statutes or quotas, and its informal character was evident. In fact, its first public appearance can be considered a failure; the manifesto had few signatories and was not published; and the Political Action Group did not have members, a board of directors or a representative assembly. This situation would continue for four years. Although Azaña had a certain initial protagonism —which was always supported by Giral and Martí— he soon lost enthusiasm.

== Creation of the Republican Alliance ==
Although the group was little more than a mere gathering of professors and writers at the Ateneo, it played a key role in uniting the different currents of republicanism. Aware of their weakness but jealous of their independence, they established contact with the Radical Republican Party of Alejandro Lerroux. Despite the discredit of the traditional republican parties, the group needed them to break out of their isolation. For his part, Lerroux was also interested in the renown that this group of intellectuals could bring him. Giral and Azaña had to work hard to overcome the reluctance of other members of the group to deal with the radicals. With the help of Antonio Marsá —a member of the Radical Party also linked to the New School— Giral and Martí organized on February 11, 1926, a joint celebration of the anniversary of the proclamation of the Republic that had a great echo throughout Spain and which meant the birth of the Republican Alliance. The board of this new unitary organization was formed by Lerroux in representation of the Radical Party, the main party of republicanism although it did not have influence in all the territory; Hilario Ayuso for the Federal Party, a political force following the tradition of Pi y Margall quite divided; Marcelino Domingo for the Catalan Republican Party, an organization that, after fleetingly affiliating with the Communist International in 1920, had been greatly weakened by the violence that plagued Barcelona between the CNT and the Free Trade Unions; Roberto Castrovido for the Republican press, a veteran journalist who had been a deputy in several legislatures; and Manuel Azaña, who was appointed to represent the Republican Action Group. Giral, Martí Jara and Marsá were listed as secretaries. The manifesto of the Alliance, which presented a moderate program, was signed by a good number of intellectuals thanks largely to the work of Giral and Jara's group.

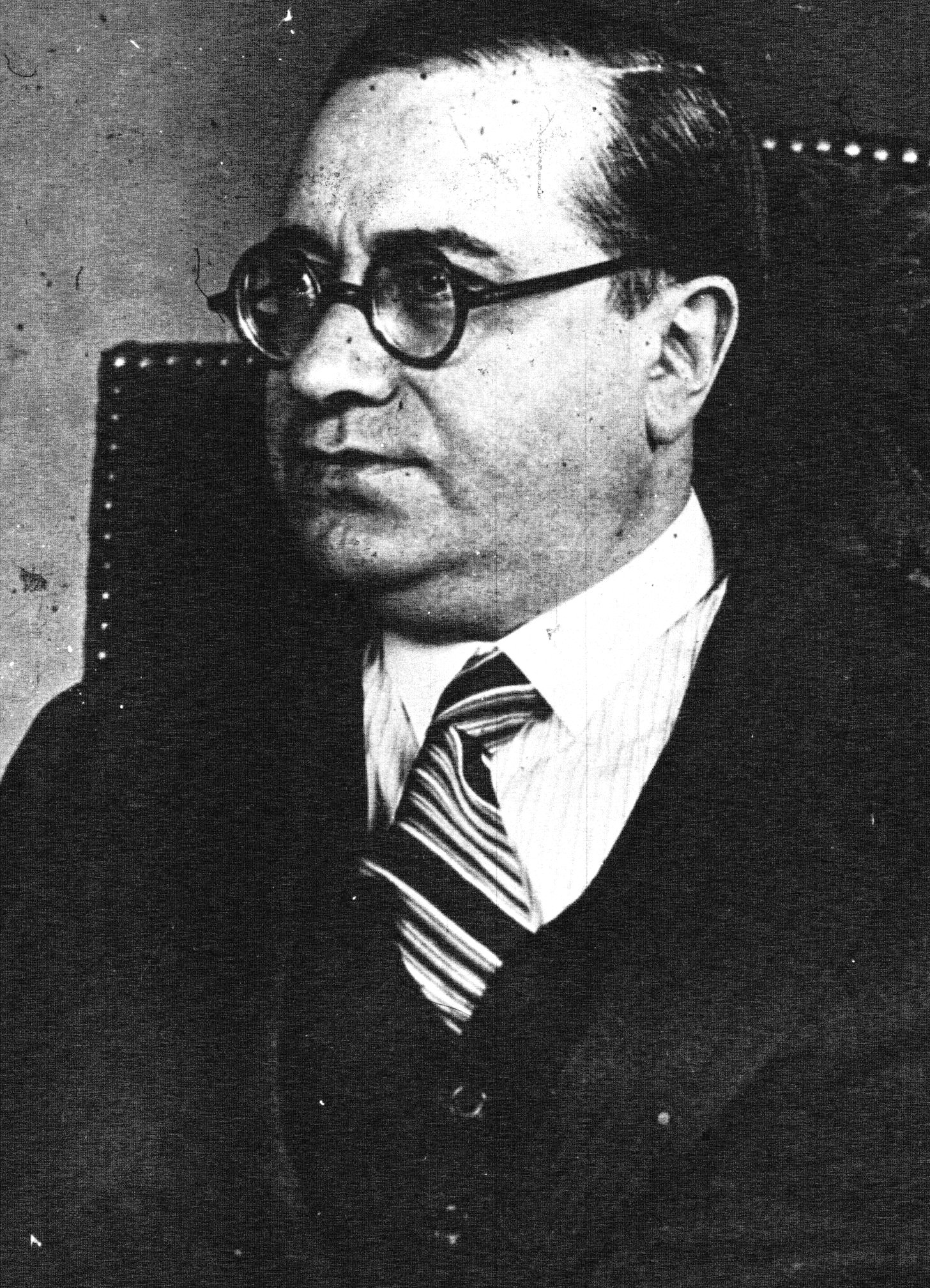
Luis Araquistáin was a member of the Group before rejoining the PSOE.

Although the beginning of the Alliance was encouraging and its organs were created in numerous provinces, it seems that its activity in successive years was almost limited to commemorating the anniversary of the proclamation of the Republic. As the Radical Party would later say, the independent intellectuals who were linked to it were generically included in Republican Action.

Through the Republican Alliance, the group supported the failed monarchist pronunciamiento of June 24, 1926 known as the Sanjuanada. Given the weakness of republicanism, it was considered convenient to collaborate with moderate monarchist sectors opposed to the Dictatorship that would have greater support within the armed forces. However, the support of the Alliance for the failed pronunciamiento of Sánchez-Guerra in 1929 caused the most left-wing sector, headed by Marcelino Domingo and Álvaro de Albornoz, to separate from the common front and create the Radical Socialist Party (PRRS) as a reaction to this collaboration with monarchist sectors and to the excessive weight of the Radical Party. It was also abandoned by part of the Federal Party and some intellectuals such as Gregorio Marañón, Jiménez de Asúa and Pérez de Ayala. The PRRS was a clear competitor of Acción Republicana as it was equally to the left of the Radical Party, achieved rapid organizational success against the disjointed local groups of Azaña's grouping, had media that supported it and its leaders were more popular as old republican leaders.

In December 1926 the Masonic lodge "Dantón" was formed, in which Giral and Martí participated. It belonged to the most "political" sector of Freemasonry and was in favor of the struggle against the Dictatorship. Other members of the group would ascribe to Freemasonry in one way or another.

== "Dictablanda" ==
=== Revitalization ===
On February 8, 1930, an assembly of the Madrid group was held for the first time, attended by more than two hundred people. In it, Azañ a was not only confirmed as the group's representative on the National Board of the Republican Alliance, but was also appointed to occupy the new secretariat of Republican Action. This remedied the impossibility of electing representatives due to the political circumstances of the Dictatorship. On this as on other occasions, and in the absence of a national representative body, the Madrid group acted as such. Three days later, at a banquet held to commemorate the Republic, Azaña gave an important speech in which he outlined the main points of his future political program: condemnation of both clericalism and militarism, the search for a formula of concord for all Hispanic peoples, the creation of a republican school and social reform. After saying that it was necessary to sweep away "the infectious clericalism of the State" and "the friar demagogy that the moderate liberals of a century ago already found repugnant", he set out his conception of the republic for which he was fighting in a phrase that even today continues to be the subject of different interpretations among the scholars of the time:

The Republic will undoubtedly shelter all Spaniards; to all it will offer justice and liberty; but it will not be a monarchy without a king: it will have to be a republican Republic, thought up by republicans, governed and directed according to the will of republicans. (Note: In the opinion of a sector of historians, such as Juan Avilés Farré, these words of Azaña announced a conception that would be shared by many left-wing republicans according to which only the republicans had the right to govern the Republic, regardless of what the vote of the citizens decided (Avilés Farré, 2006, p. 58). However, Azaña's biographer Santos Juliá makes a more conjunctural interpretation of the comment. He considers that Azaña intended to put an end to the triple concertation that had been forming in which the Republicans were flanked by monarchists on their right and by socialists on their left. According to Juliá, later statements by Azaña would go in this direction of denying the enlargement of the political front by the right if the incorporation to it was not accompanied by an explicit profession of republican faith (Juliá, 2008, pp. 262–263). On the contrary, Pío Moa, a best-selling writer of popular history books, considers that this speech by Azaña reflects a key and permanent idea in his political thought, and describes it as Jacobin and antidemocratic (Moa, 2003, p. 50).)

The fall of the dictator and his replacement by General Berenguer revitalized the activity of the group, which until then had operated only within the Republican Alliance. In March of the same year it issued a manifesto in which it expressed its objective of establishing the Republic and of serving to channel the republicanism that was not active in the existing parties. Not being a political party, the group lacked a hierarchical organization.

The Republican Action Group operated through a central body constituted in Madrid and bodies constituted in many other cities. It has no president, much less a leader. All its affiliates are equal. Each body delegates to one or more of its members when matters affecting the whole Group are to be dealt with jointly. The most urgent thing is to intensify the propaganda entrusted to each local organization, to perfect the organization, to create it where it does not exist, to keep the censuses up to date, to activate as much as possible the communication of some organizations with others. In all other political matters, including the constitutional problem of the Republic to be established, the Group does not formulate any program nor asks its members to have a common profession, nor hinders them to propagate their personal points of view inside or outside the Group, while maintaining the republican affirmation.

Among the 140 signatories, all from the Madrid group, there were twenty-seven professors, sixteen lawyers, thirteen doctors, twelve pharmacists, seven employees, six writers, six professors and five journalists. Intellectuals predominated, therefore, and among them, those of science over those of letters. Several of them, like Azaña, belonged to the Ateneo de Madrid. Seven of the signatories were Masons.

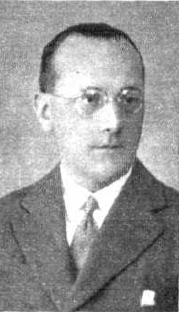
José Giral was one of the founders of the Group.

Different from Azaña's speech was the tone of the manifesto of the Murcia group:

In the Republican Action Group of Murcia, there is room for the most diverse tendencies, provided that all of them pursue as a common objective the establishment of the Republic in Spain, keeping among the members, reciprocally, the most exquisite respect for the convictions and feelings of each one, both in the religious and social order (...). All shades of republicanism have a place, from the extreme right to the most radical leftist, always, of course, based on the maintenance of social order. Fortunately, those times in which the concept of Republic was confused or tried to be confused with those of licentiousness, anarchy and the derangement of all the organs of power and authority are long gone.

In March, the Republican Alliance declared itself in favor of the autonomy of the regions. Also at that time, a group of Castilian writers, including Azaña, traveled to Barcelona at the invitation of their Catalan colleagues. The reason was to receive gratitude for the support they had given to the Catalan language during the Dictatorship. During the visit, Azaña made a speech that was very much to the liking of the Catalan nationalists, as he said that Catalonia had the right to self-government and that, if one day it wanted to "row its own ship", it would have to be allowed to do so. This was clear support for the possibility of secession. During this period, Acción Republicana was still not a political party, but merely a loose political organization of cadres.

=== Growth and alliances ===
The Dictatorship had strengthened republicanism, but it was necessary to coordinate the dispersed existing groups. A first breakthrough was achieved in May, when the Republican Alliance and the Radical Socialist Party signed an agreement creating a coordinating committee which was gradually joined by other organizations. On July 11 the Alliance began negotiations with the Spanish Socialist Workers Party (PSOE). Azaña was again a member of the negotiating group. Shortly afterwards, the Liberal Republican Right of the former monarchists Niceto Alcalá-Zamora and Miguel Maura joined the agreement. All that was missing was the support of the Catalan nationalists, who distrusted Lerroux's centralism. First Marcelino Domingo and later José Salmerón were in charge of building bridges with them. The result was that the Catalan Republican parties agreed to participate in a meeting to be held in San Sebastian on August 17.

The discussions that took place during the meeting of the so-called Pact of San Sebastian were difficult, especially with regard to Catalan nationalism. Azaña was once again the representative of the Republican Action Group, but he arrived late to the meeting and did not participate in the discussions on nationalist aspirations. Finally a vague agreement was reached in favor of autonomy for Catalonia, which had to be extended to the Basque Country and Galicia. A revolutionary committee was also created, presided over by Alcalá-Zamora, of which Azaña was a member representing the group.

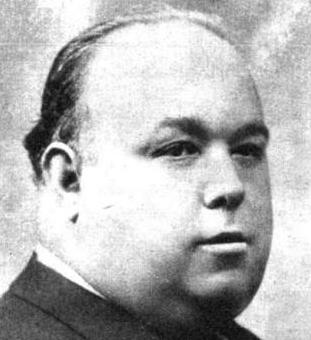
Pedro Rico was in favor of participation in the elections and would become mayor of Madrid.

Around this time, the growth of the group, as well as that of the Republican parties, began to be very pronounced. On September 28, 1930, a large Republican rally was held in Madrid's bullring in front of more than 20,000 people. Azaña spoke on behalf of the Republican Action Group, although the last intervention corresponded to Lerroux in recognition of the strength and seniority of his party. Azaña called to be "men, determined to conquer the rank of citizens or perish in the endeavor". Together with Alcalá-Zamora, both leaders of the Alliance were the main speakers. The success of the rally favored other monarchist politicians to switch to the Republican side.

Taking advantage of the rally, the Republican Alliance held an assembly the following day in which the Radical Party was predominant and the Republican Action Group had, at most, 10% of the delegates. The possible participation in the next elections was discussed. A proposal was presented which called for abstention in the face of the imminent elections which General Berenguer was planning to call, with the argument that they would serve to strengthen the monarchy. Against it, Pedro Rico made a decisive intervention in which he recalled that the Socialists were not going to abstain and argued that abstention would mean the disappearance of the movement if it was permanent, and would mean accepting what was decided by the monarchists if it was temporary. Finally, it was decided that the member parties of the Alliance would sovereignly decide the path to follow. A 31-member national council was also elected, which included thirteen members of the Group. The six-member executive committee was parity, and included Azaña, Giral and Honorato de Castro. It was during this period that the Alliance deployed its highest level of propaganda, in contrast to the scant activity of the monarchist right wing.

=== Failure of the conspiracy ===
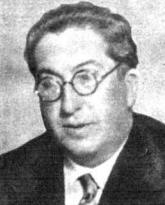
Eduardo Ortega y Gasset left the Group before the proclamation of the Republic, in which he played a leading role.

The negotiations between Republicans and Socialists were long and required several meetings between Azaña and Alcalá-Zamora, on the one hand, and Julián Besteiro, Largo Caballero and Fernando de los Ríos on the other. On October 19 a definitive agreement was reached with the Socialists, who joined the revolutionary committee and undertook to support the planned pronunciamiento with a general strike. Shortly afterwards, the committee decided to call itself a "provisional government" and to make a distribution of ministerial portfolios. Azaña was given the post of Minister of War, one of the most important in the event that the republic was implemented due to the monarchist predominance in the ranks of the armed forces, the participation of many military personnel in the Dictatorship and the existence of internal conflicts that were difficult to resolve. It seems that it was one of the few portfolios that were assigned by virtue of the presumed technical training of the "minister", since Azaña had made some studies on the military policy of France, had visited the fronts during the Great War and had elaborated the military paper of the Reformist Party in its 1918 congress.

The now "provisional government" was preparing the traditional insurrectionary path. To this end, it maintained contacts with a revolutionary military committee presided over by General Queipo de Llano to prepare the pronunciamiento, but it was unsuccessful in its attempt to win the collaboration of the National Confederation of Labor (CNT), which was planning its own insurrection. This was unleashed between November 17 and 20, was a failure and involved the arrest of numerous anarcho-syndicalist militants. The Republicans finally set December 15 as the day on which their uprising would take place. However, Captain Galán prematurely revolted the garrison of Jaca on the 12th, a rebellion that was easily put down after causing some deaths and which concluded with the execution by firing squad of Galán himself and his companion García Hernández. On the 14th most of the members of the revolutionary committee were arrested, the military conspirators did not dare to act and the socialists did not call the general strike in Madrid. However, the executions of Galán and García, who became martyrs, did much more damage to the Monarchy than the ineffective insurrection.

Azaña avoided prison by hiding in his father-in-law's house, where he remained isolated for several months and without any contact with his comrades. There is no known activity of the Republican Action Group during this time, with the exception of a meeting of the Madrid group held on February 10, 1931, which ratified –a posteriori— the decision of the Republicans not to participate in the elections. However, the imprisoned members of the "Provisional Government" continued to conspire from prison, since the Republican movement had not lost popular support. The refusal of the latter to take part in the electoral process finally provoked the resignation of General Berenguer on February 14, 1931.

== Proclamation of the Republic ==
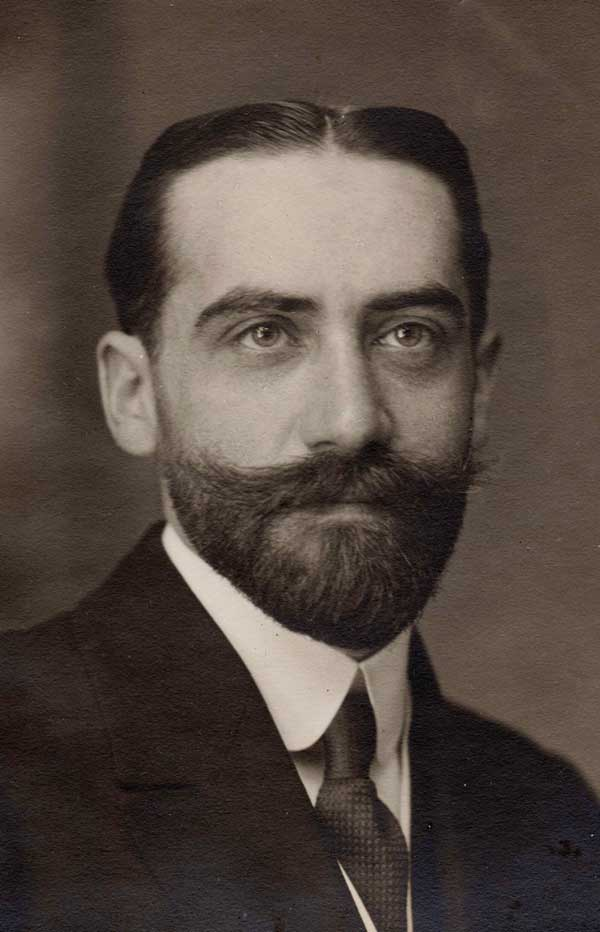
Amós Salvador took with him to AR a large part of the members of the Liberal Party of Logroño.

The desperation of the regime was evident in the fact that Alfonso XIII tried to entrust the formation of a new government to the liberal Santiago Alba, who had been the object of fierce attacks by the Dictatorship. The latter, exiled in Paris, refused. The monarch then offered the post to Sánchez Guerra, who had led a pronunciamiento against Primo de Rivera. The veteran conservative politician visited the members of the Republican committee in prison and offered them to participate in the cabinet, but they refused any collaboration with the Monarchy. Finally, the king appointed Admiral Aznar as head of government. The visit of Sánchez-Guerra to the imprisoned committee was interpreted as a confirmation of the weakness of the regime and the triumph of the Republicans, as Azaña himself affirmed in an article published in La Tierra on April 2.

On March 23, 1931, the imprisoned members of the committee were sentenced to a reduced sentence of six months and one day in prison and released, which was even more damaging to the monarchist government. Aznar first proposed to hold municipal elections on April 12, and Republicans and Socialists agreed to participate in them. Primo de Rivera's regime had broken the Conservative and Liberal parties, the mainstays of the Restoration regime for decades, although the caciques still retained their influence in the countryside. On the other hand, the fall of the Dictatorship had revitalized republicanism, which had been traditionally weak. On the same day, April 10, Azaña expressed to Solidaridad Obrera his confidence that the imminent triumph of the Republican-Socialist Conjunction would provoke a "national uprising" and his skepticism regarding the possibility that the king would resign.

It is difficult to assess the presence that Acción Republicana had within the coalition, as only fragmentary data is known. In Madrid, three of the thirty candidates were from the group: Honorato de Castro, the doctor Fernando Coca and the lawyer Pedro Rico. In Alicante it also occupied three of the twenty-nine candidacies, which were totally successful. However, it had no representation in Valencia because a local section of the group had not been formed. Its position in Logroño was stronger because it had inherited almost all the local organization of the Liberal Party due to the passage to its ranks of its leader Amós Salvador. Thanks to this it held five of the twenty seats: the professor Benigno Marroyo, the businessman Bernabé Bergasa, and the engineers Manuel Sánchez Herrero, Bonifacio Fernández Torralba and Amadeo Navascués. All of them were elected.

The elections gave a clear victory to the Republican-Socialist conjunction in most of the big cities, a triumph that was not compensated by the victory of the monarchists in the rural areas. The Government accepted the result as a plebiscite and did not resort to the use of force. In addition, General Sanjurjo, director of the Civil Guard, said that he could not guarantee the loyalty of the corps. Faced with the passivity of the government, the revolutionary committee occupied the Ministry of the Interior and proclaimed the Republic without any kind of transfer of power and without the need for any violence. On the night of April 14, the committee appeared on the balcony, now transformed into an authentic provisional government. At 11:00 pm, Azaña took possession of the Ministry of War, confirming in his post the Undersecretary General Ruiz Fornells, who was the one who went out to receive him.

== Provisional government ==
=== Military reform ===
The same night of April 14–15, Azaña sent a telegram to all the garrisons communicating that he was taking charge of the Ministry of the Army, the new name for the Ministry of War. In his first official act as minister —the end of the captains' course at the Central Shooting School— he gave a speech in which he stated that no military man would be asked about his convictions and announced his intention to reform the Army to turn it into an effective weapon. A decree of the Presidency of the government repealed the Law of Jurisdictions of March 23, 1906; it also proceeded to appoint captains general and commanders at the head of the different divisions.

The Republican Action Group had only one minister, but Azaña's performance at the head of the Ministry of the Army was one of the most outstanding of the Provisional Government. The new minister had been interested in military matters for years and intended to reform the Army to prepare it to face any foreign enemy. One of his first measures was symbolic: a decree of 22 April 1931 gave all military personnel four days to swear an oath of loyalty to the Republic or leave the armed forces. Although few soldiers opted for retirement, more were offended by the demand. The conservative press spread the rumor that those who did not pledge loyalty to the Republic would be expelled from the Army. In reality, what was actually done was to transfer them to the reserves with the corresponding salary.

Of greater significance was the decree of 25 April which sought to address the problem of the excess of chiefs and officers that the Army had been suffering from for a long time and which would become known as the Azaña law. The minister's solution was to offer the transfer to the reserve, while maintaining full pay, to all commanders who requested it. More than eight thousand soldiers opted for this retirement. Despite the voluntary nature of the solution, the regulation was controversial. The decree stated that, after thirty days, any surplus officer who had not voluntarily opted for the measure could lose his rank without receiving any compensation. Although the threat was never put into practice, many military officers felt pressured by having to make a momentous decision in a short period of time. On the other hand, Republicans who wished to purge the armed forces criticized the fact that the occasion was not used to get rid of commanders disaffected with the Republic.

Azaña did not know how to win over important military men either. In April it was reported that the Minister of the Interior, Miguel Maura, had suggested that he appoint General Franco as High Commissioner in Morocco. However, the minister preferred to opt for General Sanjurjo for the post. Other controversial measures were the suppression of the rank of lieutenant general and that of the captaincies general. In general, Azaña's policy was reformist and not revolutionary, but the way it was carried out hurt the sensibilities of the military. Even those who shared the opinion that there was a surplus of personnel felt uncomfortable with such a drastic reduction of the officer corps. Moreover, the minister tended to be advised by military officers who sympathized with the Republic rather than by military officers of higher rank and prestige, which annoyed the majority of the officer corps. This group of collaborators, which included Commanders Hernández Saravia and Menéndez López, was known disparagingly as the "black cabinet".

The uneasiness in the Armed Forces was accentuated by the "campaign of responsibilities". This was an issue that had been going on since before the establishment of the Dictatorship, but the Provisional Government added events that took place during the governments of Primo de Rivera and Berenguer. With the death of the former, the latter was the propitiatory victim. On April 17, Berenguer was arrested; on April 21, General Mola was arrested for his performance as Director General of Security. Although not many were affected and the campaign helped to maintain the Republican popular fervor, in the long run it took a heavy toll by creating the image of a vengeful Republic.

=== Burning of convents in May ===
The anticlericalism of the Republicans was to provoke events that were to be of great importance. On Sunday, May 10, incidents occurred on the occasion of a monarchist meeting. Republican sympathizers confronted the monarchists and many of them tried to storm the headquarters of the monarchist newspaper ABC. The Guardia Civil prevented the attack, but at the cost of causing the death of two of the aggressors. The Minister of the Interior, Miguel Maura, received reports that extremist members of the Ateneo were distributing lists of churches they wanted to burn the following day. Despite a request from Maura, Azaña, who was a director of the Ateneo, refused to talk to the radicals. On the 11th there was an organized burning of convents in the capital. Some Republican sympathizers —among them Cipriano Rivas Cherif, Azaña's brother-in-law and member of the Republican Action Group— celebrated the event and the provisional government remained passive. In fact, within the Council of Ministers there was a strong debate on the matter. Maura proposed using the Civil Guard to put an end to arson. However, Azaña led a strong opposition to such a measure and went so far as to affirm that all the convents in Madrid were not worth the life of a Republican. (Note: Azaña's position of categorical opposition to the use of the Civil Guard to prevent the arsonists from acting has been later commented in books of memoirs by at least three of the attendants to the meeting of the Council of Ministers (Avilés Farré, 2006, p. 93, note 10). The then Minister of the Interior Miguel Maura relates in his book Así cayó Alfonso XIII... (How Alfonso XIII fell), among other things, the following: —"So 'kindling fires' it is! You are a fool", —I replied—. "Either you let me unleash the strength onto the streets, or all the convents in Madrid will burn, one after another". —"That's out of the question", —exclaimed Azaña—. "The lives of all the convents in Madrid aren't worth a single Republican's life". (...) — "Nothing is happening in Barcelona and Valencia today. You'll see tomorrow whether something happens or not" —I warned them—. "Besides, it's quite simple to deal with those scoundrels Indalecio saw. If you just give the order for the Civil Guard to go to the streets, I guarantee you that in ten minutes, not a single one of them will remain". —"I've said I'm strongly opposed to it", —threatened Azaña—, "and I won't continue a minute longer in the government if there's a single person injured in Madrid because of this stupidity". (Maura, 1995, pp. 251–252). The President of the provisional government, Niceto Alcalá-Zamora, recounts the events as follows:... Azaña exploded in fury and threatened that if that other force, hated according to him by the people, was sent, he would immediately leave the government and appeal to the Republican parties for resistance. (...) Azaña's furious attitude, with the riot and crime already in the streets, posed the most heinous and shameful crisis on record, as well as the most difficult. (...) While Azaña's culpability in the spread of the fires is evident, it would be absurd, arbitrary, and injurious to attribute to him prior agreement with the arsonist criminals, not even to suggest that without prior arrangement with them, he deliberately proposed to decisively aid their devastation. (Alcalá-Zamora, 1998, pp. 219–222) The then Minister of Communications, Diego Martínez Barrio, uses the following words in his memoirs: Maura insisted on his purpose. The president hesitated. Then Azaña uttered the words attributed to several ministers: "It is preferable for some buildings to burn than for a Republican to die". The agreement reached was the one forced upon all governments that feel weak: to wait. From that moment on, we no longer directed the events; they directed us. (Martínez Barrio, 1983, p. 37)) The Minister of the Army threatened to resign if the forces of order caused a single wounded person. After long hesitations, the Government opted to declare a state of war and bring the army into the streets to restore order, which put an end to the fires in Madrid.

On the 12th, the assaults spread to other towns in Andalusia and Levante, particularly Malaga. Only on the 15th did the arsonists cease their activity. A hundred buildings had been affected, and in several towns, the friars and nuns had abandoned their convents in fear of the anticlerical explosion. The consequences would be very negative for the image of the new regime. In the words of President Alcalá-Zamora "they created enemies he did not have; they broke the compact solidity of his seat; they stained his credit until then diaphanous and unlimited". The note of protest that Cardinal Vidal y Barraquer sent to the President on the 17th was along the same lines: "facts of this nature... diminish the confidence that a large sector of Catholics had inspired in the discreet action of the Government in many of its first dispositions".

A few days later, the Council of Ministers debated the possibility of expelling the Society of Jesus from Spain. Azaña, together with the socialist radicals Álvaro de Albornoz and Marcelino Domingo and the socialist Fernando de los Ríos, was in favor of proceeding with the expulsion at that moment, with the argument of not having to do it later, pressured by new assaults on convents. Despite his opinion, the measure was not adopted.

== Transformation into a party ==
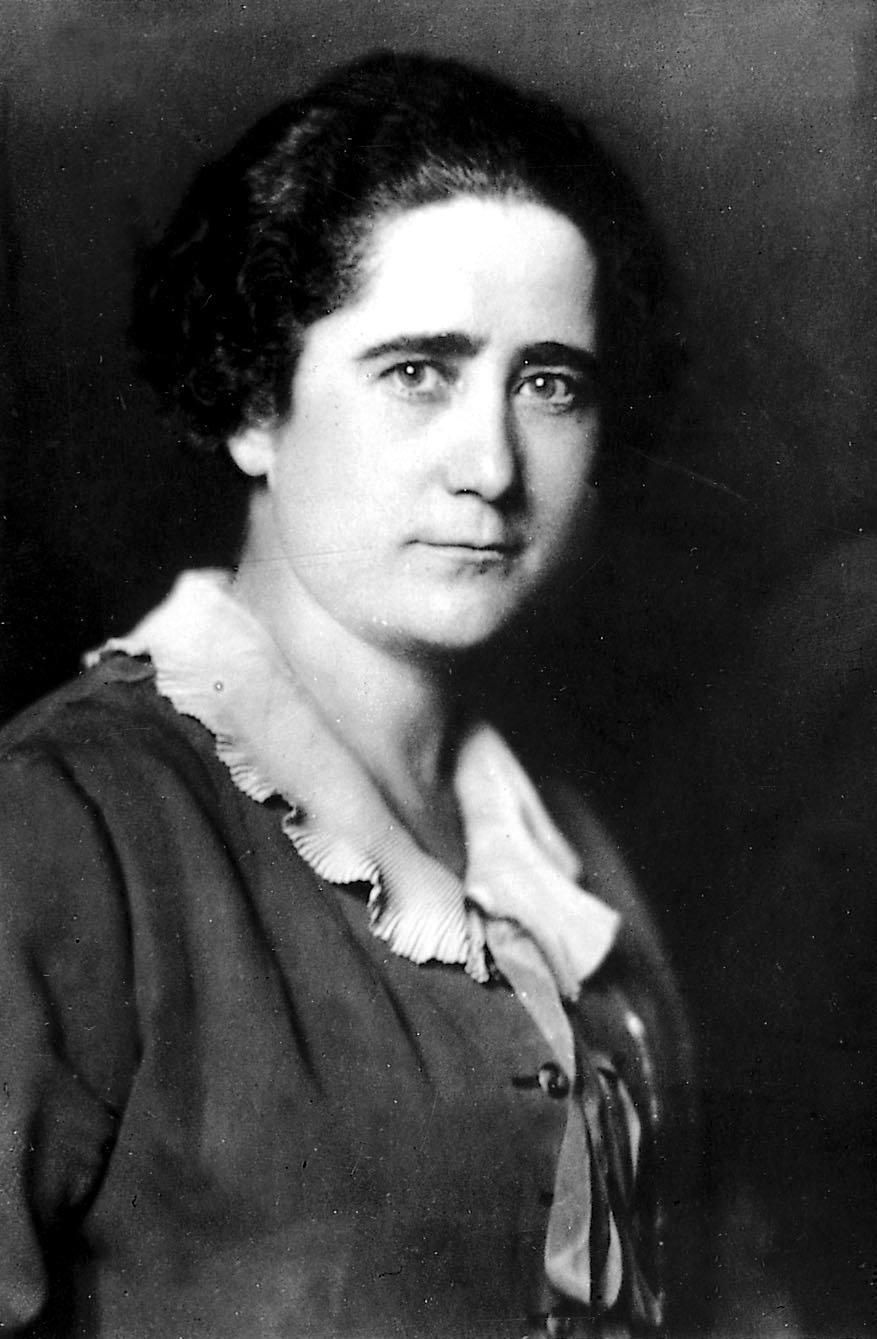
Clara Campoamor was the only woman who formed part of the national council of the new Republican Action party.

Until the arrival of the Republic, the Republican Action Group had been limited to being a platform of support for Lerroux's Radical Party within the Republican Alliance. The transition to the Republic, which was its objective, had been achieved quickly and without the group's protagonism. Having achieved the objective of regime change, the group, which was constantly receiving new members, had to decide whether to dissolve or organize itself as a political party. In favor of the first option was that there were already two more solid republican parties, the Radical and the Radical Socialist. In favor of the second, the clear determination maintained by Azaña and Giral in favor of the independence of the group. In the event of restructuring, it should not only choose leaders —which meant a substantial change with respect to its previous trajectory— but should also opt for a political program, abandoning the lack of definition of which the Murcia group had spoken. After consulting the other groups in Spain, on May 19 the Madrid group met under the initial presidency of Giral, who handed it over to Azaña. Those gathered decided that the group should "constitute itself as a party with a left-wing orientation". To this end, they elected a provisional national council in charge of preparing the first national assembly of the party.

The provisional council was composed of Azaña, Giral, Pedro Rico, José Serrano Batanero, Manuel Martínez Risco, José Royo Gómez, Honorato de Castro, Hipólito Rodríguez Pinilla, Luis Fernández Clérigo, Luis Doporto, Clara Campoamor and Amós Salvador.

The national assembly was held on May 26 and 27 in Madrid and its debates were chaired by Azaña. The new Acción Republicana party defined itself as a left-wing party and proclaimed the following objectives: parliamentary democracy, municipal autonomy, legal recognition of the regions, pacifism, reduction of the army, tax deduction for labor, progressive taxes on income and wealth, laicism of the State, secularization of religious orders, State monopoly of education, recognition of the social function of property, approval of divorce, social assistance and agrarian reform. The program was very similar to that of the Radical Socialist Party, although it omitted any reference to equality of the sexes and had less rhetoric concerning popular control of the state apparatus. In the new national council there was a woman: Clara Campoamor, who however soon left the party. (Note: Clara Campoamor herself explained some years later that she had belonged to the Republican Action group since 1929 but that, when it became a party, she had opted for the Radical. Clara Campoamor, El voto femenino y yo, Sevilla, Instituto Andaluz de la Mujer, 2001 (1st ed, 1936), ISBN 8479210826, p. 235.) It also expressed the will to demand the responsibility of the governments of the Monarchy and of the Monarchy itself. The commitment to the Republican Alliance was maintained and the intention to collaborate with the Socialists was reaffirmed. Consequently, it pronounced itself in favor of maintaining the Republican-Socialist Conjunction with a view to the elections to the constituent Cortes.

== Transcendence ==
The Republican Action Group was not an important political force during the Dictatorship. Azaña himself later said that it was no more than "an Ateneo gathering, made up of professors and writers". Its main contribution during this period was to serve as a unifying and revitalizing force for the fragmented and discredited Republican opposition. Through the Republican Alliance he supported the various civil-military conspiracies that were plotted against the Dictatorship, but he played a clearly subordinate role to openly monarchist or "constitutionalist" politicians who carried the weight of his organization. It was the fall of the dictator that led the Group to begin to act with its own personality. The historian Stanley G. Payne considers that it was a group led by intellectuals and professionals younger than those of the old republican parties, and that it proposed a more "radical and leftist" republic than the one advocated by the old Radical Party.

The proclamation of the Republic and the entry into the provisional government revealed Azaña as one of the most outstanding ministers. His military reform was highly praised at the time by the philosopher José Ortega y Gasset. However, the resistance of the Minister of the Army to the Government's combating the burning of convents in May had a decisive influence on the passive posture of the executive and led to the destruction of ecclesiastical patrimony. The event would end up having disastrous consequences for the Republic, as the then head of government Alcalá-Zamora later wrote. The historian Hugh Thomas assesses the event saying that "evidently a stain had fallen on the record of the Republic", while the aforementioned Payne describes the behavior of the Government as "spasmodic", not knowing how to adopt prudent measures at the beginning and then overreacting.

The Group would give rise to a Republican Action party which, although small in size, played an important role in the coalition governments of the first two years of the new regime and ended up being the nucleus of the Republican Left. In general, Acción Republicana has been considered an elite group composed of qualified intellectuals. One of its main contributions to Spanish politics was that of its undisputed leader, Manuel Azaña, who would become president first of the government and later of the Republic. His authority within the political formation gave it great cohesion despite the internal ideological diversity, which strengthened the party.

== See also ==
- Republican Action (Spain)

== Bibliography ==
- Avilés Farré, Juan (2006). La Izquierda burguesa y la tragedia de la II República (in Spanish). Madrid: Comunidad de Madrid. pp. 36–96. ISBN 9788445128817.
- Casanova, Julián (2007). Historia de España 8. República y guerra civil (in Spanish). Barcelona: Editorial Crítica / Marcial Pons. pp. 4–26. ISBN 978-84-8432-878-0.
- Espin, Eduardo (1979). "Acción Republicana y la estabilidad gubernamental en el sistema de partidos de la II República". Revista de derecho político (in Spanish) (3): 85–108. ISSN 0210-7562.
- ——— (1980). Azaña en el poder. El partido de Acción Republicana (in Spanish). Madrid: Centro de Investigaciones Sociológicas. pp. 27–52. ISBN 84-7476-033-X.
- Juliá, Santos (2008). Vida y tiempo de Manuel Azaña (1880–1940) (in Spanish). Madrid: Taurus. pp. 235–286. ISBN 978-84-306-0696-2.
- Moa, Pío (2003). Los mitos de la Guerra Civil (in Spanish). Madrid: La Esfera de los Libros. p. 50. ISBN 84-9734-093-0.
- Payne, Stanley G. (1995). La primera democracia española (in Spanish). Barcelona: Ediciones Paidós. pp. 42–62. ISBN 84-493-0128-9.
- Preston, Paul (1994). Franco, "caudillo de España" (in Spanish). Barcelona: Editorial Grijalbo. pp. 91–107. ISBN 84-253-2498-X.
- Thomas, Hugh (1995). La Guerra Civil Española (in Spanish). Barcelona: Grijalbo Mondadori. p. 79. ISBN 84-253-2767-9.

=== Primary sources ===
- Alcalá-Zamora, Niceto (1998). Memorias (in Spanish). Barcelona: Planeta. pp. 219–222. ISBN 84-08-02608-9.
- Martínez Barrio, Diego (1983). Memorias (in Spanish). Barcelona: Planeta. p. 37. ISBN 84-320-5690-1.
- Maura, Miguel (1995). Así cayó Alfonso XIII... (in Spanish). Barcelona: Ariel. pp. 251–252. ISBN 84-344-1130-X.

== Disclaimer ==
- The quotations included in note 2 are from primary sources whose content is not yet in the public domain and is protected by copyright law. They have been included for informational purposes in accordance with U.S. law. Users must take this into account in order not to make improper use of these texts in accordance with the legislation applicable in their place of residence.
