= Scott Hightower =

American poet

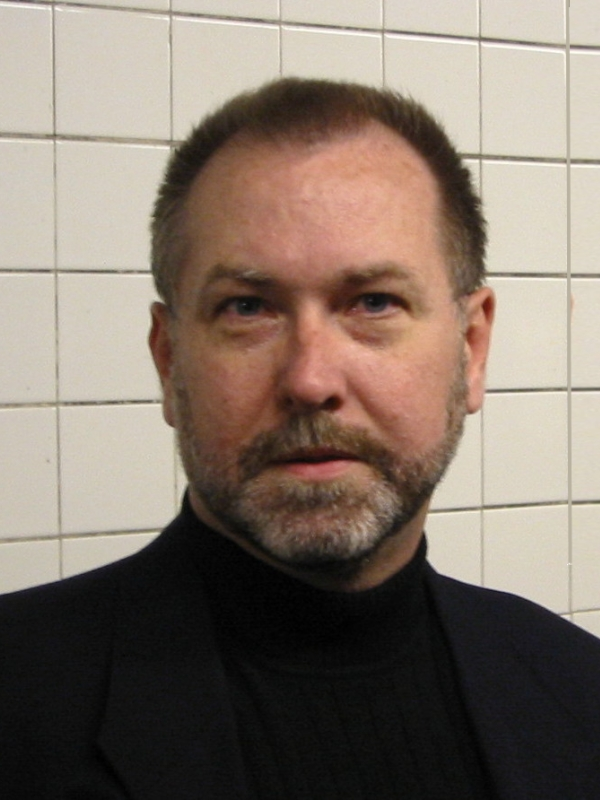

Scott Hightower is an American poet, teacher, and reviewer. He is the author of five books of poetry. His third, Part of the Bargain, won the 2004 Hayden Carruth Award for New and Emerging Poets. He is a recipient of a Willis Barnstone Translation Prize for a translation from Spanish.

== Early life and education ==
Hightower was born in Lampasas, Texas. He was the youngest child of a family that lived on a modest working ranch near the hamlet of Lometa, Texas. Hightower had a sister and a brother. Billie Jewel Hightower (July 27, 1950 (Lampasas, Texas) - Oct. 15, 1992, West Palm Beach, Florida), his brother became a noted painter in Texas, the Chicago area, and Florida.

At the University of Texas at Austin, Hightower studied classical civilization, literature, and performance, earning his BA in communications in 1973. He earned a Master's degree in teaching at Antioch College in 1977. Eventually, he earning his Master of Fine Arts degree from Columbia University in 1994 where he studied under J.D. McClatchy. Poet William Matthews was also one of his mentors.

== Career ==
Hightower’s first four English-language collections are sweeps of philosophical idylls, much in the tradition of Theocritus, a poet the author himself evokes from time to time. In the Anglo-Saxon tradition, the stance of the poet is that of an observant pilgrim traveling through the world. The poems range widely in style and subject: soliloquies, laments, eccentric ponderings, and contemplations of the physical and the sublime.

In Tin Can Tourist, Hightower’s first book, the poems covers the plains of Texas to the streets of the Bronx; from the bedroom to the Spanish Steps of Rome and the Chora Church of Istanbul and back. The poems examines cultural highs and lows. Of the book, poet Marie Ponsot wrote, "The most exciting quality of Hightower’s work is its poetic and paradoxical unifying of emotional and intellectual depth with a marvelous quietness. Its lively incidents and anecdotes are grounded, rooted, in meditative awareness."

In Natural Trouble, the theme of inheritance extends through changes of landscape and bad weather. Of this book, poet J.D. McClatchy wrote: "Scott Hightower has Marianne Moore’s scissors and Elizabeth Bishop’s spectacles and he has written a book in the spirit of their adventurous precisions."

Hightower’s third book, Part of the Bargain, received the 2004 Copper Canyon Press Hayden Carruth Award for New and Emerging Poets. In it, Hightower explores the reconciliations that make one an individual, a part of a community, and as conscientious heir to a culture. Valences of biology, sexuality, nationality, literality, all swirl together.

Self-evident departs from a notion that the practice of writing is at the elemental core of democracy. He reminds us that poetry by definition "seeks a foundation of the commonwealth in the truth of the individual, guaranteed and restored through the integrity of Language."

Hontanares was published by Devenir (el otro), Madrid, 2012. It is a bilingual collection of poems translated into Spanish by Natalia Carbajosa from Cartagena. Hontanares was launched in at El Círculo de Bellas Artes in Madrid, Nov. 13, 2012. Carbajosa, publisher Juan Pastor, and novelist Antonio Muñoz Molina made presentations. This book extends Hightower's work on the Albornoz family, a family of statesmen (Álvaro de Albornoz y Liminiana and Severo Ochoa de Albornoz), scientists, and poets, including Aurora de Albornoz. This book bridges into Hightower's Self-evident with its themes of radical thought and exile.

Of Imperative to Spare, Hightower's 2023 release, poet Cynthia Hogue wrote: "This necessary volume blazes a trail through despair to wisdom.”

Hightower's poetry reviews often appear in Fogged Clarity, The Brooklyn Rail, The Journal, Manhattan Review, Coldfront Magazine, and other national journals. He teaches writing at New York University's Gallatin School of Individualized Study. He lives in New York City and sojourns in Spain.

== Books of poetry ==
- Tin Can Tourist (Fordham University Press, 2001)
- Natural Trouble (Fordham University Press, 2003)
- Part of the Bargain (Copper Canyon Press, 2005) - 2004 Hayden Carruth Award
- Self-evident (Barrow Street Press, 2012)
- Hontanares (Devenir, 2012), translated by Natalia Carbajosa [English/Spanish]
- Tartessos (Devenir, 2019), translated by Maria Elena Becerril-Longares with the assistance of José Luis Fernández de Albornoz and Guadalupe Ruiz Fajardo [English/Spanish]
- Contraído (Elenvés Editoras, 2022) [English/Spanish]
- Imperative to Spare (Rebel Satori Press, 2023)

== As editor ==
- Women Rowing: An Anthology of Contemporary US Women Poets, translations by Natalia Carbajosa (Mantis Editores, Mexico, 2012)
