= April 1931 Cádiz municipal election =

1931 Cádiz City Council election
- 12 April 1931

All 40 seats in the Cádiz City Council 21 seats needed for a majority
	First party	Second party
Leader	Ramón de Carranza	Emilio de Sola
Party	Monarchist Coalition	Republican-Socialist Conjunction
Seats won	40	0
Popular vote	24.081	5.595
Percentage	81.15%	18.85%
Mayor before election
Ramón de Carranza
PLC
Elected mayor
Elections anulled

On April 12, 1931, local elections were held throughout Spain, which would lead to the proclamation of the Second Spanish Republic after the victory of anti-monarchist candidates in most provincial capitals. In Cádiz, the elections were between the Monarchical Coalition and the Republican-Socialist Conjunction, with a total victory for the former, which managed to win all the council seats. After the proclamation of the Second Spanish Republic, the Provisional Government of the Republic would call for repeat elections in those municipalities where complaints had been filed against the results, including Cádiz.

== Electoral System ==
The number of councilors in each municipal council was determined by the population census. According to the Municipal Law of 1877, Cádiz was assigned 40 councilors, as it had a population between 75,001 and 80,000 inhabitants.

The Electoral Law of 1907 established that councilors had to be elected in districts of 4 members, although districts with between 3 and 7 members were also allowed. Voters were required to select several candidates through limited voting, which allowed them to vote for fewer candidates than the number of seats to be filled. The candidates who obtained a plurality of votes in each district were elected. If the number of candidates was equal to or lower than the number of seats to be filled, the candidates were automatically proclaimed without the need for elections. Voting was compulsory, although this was not enforced, and was based on universal male suffrage; eligible voters were men over twenty-five years of age with at least two years of residence in a municipality. Mayors were indirectly elected by the municipal council at the first session following the elections.

Cádiz was divided into 9 electoral districts that elected 4 councilors each, except for "Hospicio and Palma" and "Escuela and Pópulo", which each elected 6 councilors.

== Parties and campaign ==
=== Monarchist Coalition ===
The Cádiz caciques reached an agreement on March 4 to form the monarchist candidacies of the province. Led by José León de Carranza, a member of the Conservative Party and son of the mayor of Cádiz Ramón de Carranza, and the Count of the Andes, they sought to restore the old cacique-based pacts of the Restoration period. They agreed to divide the province into two spheres of influence: the capital and its surroundings for the Carranza family, and Jerez and the Sierra of Cádiz for the Count of the Andes.

This agreement excluded the supporters of former dictator Primo de Rivera grouped around the National Monarchist Union. They were led by José María Pemán and would break off their collaboration with the Cádiz oligarchs as a result of the aforementioned pact, criticizing the return of “cacique-style practices” that they considered contrary to the “work of Primo de Rivera.”

Despite these divisions, Mayor Carranza would present an electoral list together with the Liberal Party, led by the cacique Juan Aramburu e Inda. This candidacy sought to achieve a "copo", which meant winning all council seats. The monarchist electoral campaign would be led by the National Monarchist Union (UMN), which supported the candidacy despite it being excluded from it and ideological reservations. Through Diario de Cádiz, the UMN would seek to gain support for the monarchists by emphasizing “the work carried out during the years of the Dictatorship” and focusing the campaign on purely administrative issues, in contrast to the political program of the opposition. The main monarchist electoral rally was held on April 9 at the Teatro Cómico in Cádiz, where the mayor stated that “the elections that are about to take place are not just any elections, like those prior to 1923, but elections in which the future of the Homeland is at stake.”

=== Republican-Socialist Conjunction ===
The Republican-Socialist list was formed quite quickly and without major complications, following the pattern of other lists put forward by the parties that had signed the Pact of San Sebastián. The campaign of the Conjunction would be much more active and dynamic than that of the monarchists, holding various rallies in the weeks and days leading up to the elections. The most important of these was the one held on the 11th in the San José neighborhood.

The desire of the civil governor to ensure the fairness of the elections worked in favor of the Republican-Socialists, who were able to carry out their rallies without complications. In an effort to prevent electoral manipulation, the governor even issued a series of regulations addressed to election monitors, urging them “not to yield to any kind of pressure.”

=== The National Confederation of Labor ===
The CNT also took part in the electoral campaign in defense of abstentionism and political amnesty, organizing several rallies in which it urged its members not to take part in the elections and called on the authorities to release political prisoners.

== Results ==
Party	Votes	%	Councillors
Monarchist Coalition (PL-PLC-UMN)	24.081	81.15	40
Republican-Socialist Conjunction (Rep-PSOE)	5.595	18.85	0
Votes	29.676	100.00	
Turnout	9.416	56.63	
Electors	16.627	100.00	

== Results by district ==
1st District: Constitución, San Francisco and San Carlos (4 councillors)

Candidate	Alliance	Votes
Luis Beltrami Urquiza	Mon	783
Julián Hervias Sánchez	Mon	766
Germán Garcés y Carnacea	Mon	730
Enrique Muñoz Beato	Mon	536
José Luis Fabre	CRS	240
Manuel Barás Artes	CRS	235
Antonio Cano Domínguez	CRS	231
Voters		3.521

2nd District: Cortes and Correos (4 councillors)

Candidate	Alliance	Votes
Gabriel Matute y Vallas	Mon	475
Roberto González Nadín	Mon	463
José María Puelles y Puelles	Mon	441
Joaquín Fernández Repeto	Mon	397
José del Corripio Rey	CRS	189
Rafael Sostoa Elosarbe	CRS	173
Emilio San Vicente de la Maza	CRS	161
Votes		2.299

3rd District: Hércules and Moreno de Mora (4 councillors)

Candidate	Alliance	Votes
Federico Víctor y Martínez-Villa	Mon	645
Diego Mateo y Paredes	Mon	608
Manuel Bernal y Bernal	Mon	608
Francisco Hoyos	Mon	579
Manuel Agudo Domínguez	CRS	220
Emilio Margaleff Villalta	CRS	206
José Pérez Cano	CRS	199
Votes		3.065

4th District: Hospicio and Palma (6 councillors)

Candidate	Alliance	Votes
Juan Luis Martínez del Cerro	Mon	743
Francisco Aguirre Mayor	Mon	725
Luis Arroyo Crespo	Mon	704
Constantino Mateo y Paredes	Mon	691
Enrique Pérez Figuier	Mon	527
Aurelio Fernández	Mon	344
Manuel de la Pinta Leal	CRS	194
Pedro Muñoz Arenilla	CRS	189
Manuel Pérez Martín	CRS	181
Alonso Peña Hidalgo	CRS	164
Votes		4.462

5th District: Libertad and San Lorenzo (4 councillors)

Candidate	Alliance	Votes
Darío Lazo	Mon	667
Manuel Castro	Mon	645
Rafael Manzano	Mon	620
Servando Rama	Mon	564
Santiago Rodríguez Piñero	CRS	281
Mariano Cancelo	CRS	264
Antonio Periñán Fernández	CRS	250
Votes		3.291

6th District: Escuela and Pópulo (6 councillors)

Candidate	Alliance	Votes
Manuel Díaz Pérez	Mon	1.004
José Abella	Mon	1.002
José Cadrato	Mon	977
José M. Marzan	Mon	953
Cayetano del Toro	Mon	702
Manuel de la Fuente Verea	Mon	642
Tomás Fabrellas	CRS	312
Manuel Prieto	CRS	305
Manuel Campo	CRS	303
Sr. Castillo	CRS	285
Miguel Rodríguez Navarrete	CRS	132
Rafael Revuelta	CRS	130
Votes		6.747

7th District: Merced (4 councillors)

Candidate	Alliance	Votes
José Monis	Mon	577
Manuel Freire Costa	Mon	547
José Barrera	Mon	545
Manuel Freire Bujan	Mon	434
José L. Pérez	CRS	89
Pedro Icardi	CRS	88
Ángel Romaní Rey	CRS	81
Votes		2.361

8th District: Santa María (4 councillors)

Candidate	Alliance	Votes
Álvaro Picardo	Mon	455
Antonio Millán	Mon	442
Francisco Fuente Villarrica	Mon	422
Ricardo de la Fuente	Mon	318
Nicolás Pita	CRS	66
Eduardo Collantes	CRS	63
Votes		1.766

9th District: Segismundo Moret (Extramuros) (4 councillors)

Candidate	Alliance	Votes
José León de Carranza	Mon	492
Luis Mexía	Mon	471
Miguel Gutiérrez	Mon	453
Antonio Treviño	Mon	384
Emilio de Sola	CRS	186
Sr. Jiménez Moral	CRS	178
Votes		2.164

== Aftermath ==
Despite some isolated incidents, the day proceeded with complete normality and resulted in a total victory for the Monarchist Coalition, with the mayor stating: “I am very grateful for the behavior of the people of Cádiz, of the entire city, and I will make this known in a manifesto.”

However, the victory of the Republican-Socialist Conjunction (CRS) in the rest of Spain and rumors that the king had abdicated led to celebrations in all neighborhoods of the city. On the night of April 12 itself, a demonstration was formed led by the Cádiz Republican leader Emilio de Sola, who headed to the City Hall to raise the republican flag, after which, he met with the civil governor requesting Carranza’s dismissal.

As news of events in Madrid started arriving in Cádiz, marches and celebrations followed one another. The proclamation of the Second Republic caused confusion among monarchist parties, with several fleeing the country and the National Monarchist Union (UMN) of Cádiz dissolving. The new government would annul Cádiz's electoral results and establish a municipal council made up of Republican-Socialist councilors, who appointed Emilio de Sola as mayor.
