= Aurora de Albornoz =

Spanish scholar and poet

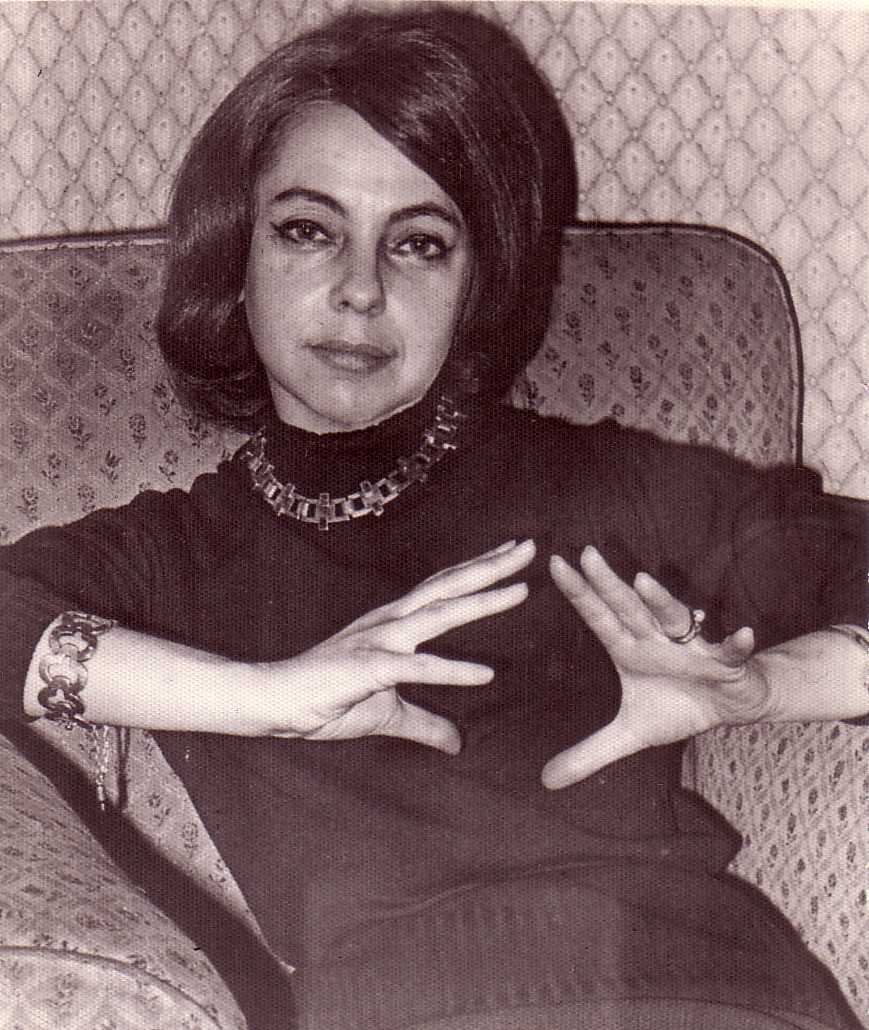
Aurora de Albornoz in Madrid, mid-1970s

Aurora de Albornoz (January 22, 1926 – June 6, 1990) was born in Luarca, Asturias, Spain. As a youth, she lived in Luarca with her parents, sister, and extended family, throughout the Spanish Civil War from 1936 to 1939— an event that inspired her later poetry.

== Early life ==
Her family was a noted family of poets and politicians. Her grandfather and father were well known local poets. Her father’s uncle, Álvaro de Albornoz y Liminiana, was the minister of the Department of Justice of the Republican government of Spain until the Civil War. Eventually, he became the president of the Republican government of Spain in exile in Paris and Mexico that was superseded by Franco's dictatorship. Concha de Albornoz, Albornoz y Liminiana's daughter, was a scholar and teacher considered as at the forefront of the modern Spanish feminist literary movement. In 1959, her uncle, Severo Ochoa de Albornoz (who had fled Spain on a Republican passport) while living and working in the United States, was awarded a Nobel Prize in Physiology and Medicine with Arthur Kornberg for deciphering RNA.

Her family had been involved in business in Puerto Rico since the 1890s. In 1944, 18 years old de Albornoz moved with the de Albornoz household to San Juan. There she began her formal academic education which led to an MA from the University of Puerto Rico. At that time, she was studying under the tutelage of the Andalucian Nobel Laureate, Juan Ramón Jiménez.

In August 1950, de Albornoz married Jorge Enjuto Bernal, from Andalusia, in Puerto Rico. Like de Albornoz, Enjuto Bernal was from a Republican family living outside Spain. His father, Federico Enjuto Ferrán, was the Republican magistrate of justice who was involved in the trial of José Antonio Primo de Rivera, the founder of the Falange, the fascist party in Spain. After living together in Puerto Rico and for a short time in Kansas and Paris, the marriage was dissolved in 1967.

== Career ==
Also at this time she began teaching. In 1955, she was awarded a scholarship to study comparative literature at the Sorbonne in Paris.

From 1955 to 1957, de Albornoz returned to Europe to continue her studies in Paris with José Bergamín, a celebrated Spanish poet and critic living in exile. She then proceeded to Spain, to complete her doctorate at the University of Salamanca. De Albornoz’s scholarly work was committed almost exclusively to the escritores exiliados of Spain.

Among other publications, in 1961, de Albornoz published, in Puerto Rico, Poesías de Guerra de Antonio Machado a compilation of Antonio Machado’s war poems which was a banned work not allowed to be published in Franco’s Spain. (Machado himself had died in exile in 1939 in Collioure, France).

Upon receiving her degree in 1966, she returned to Puerto Rico to become a professor at the University of Puerto Rico.

Around 1968, de Albornoz returned to Madrid where she taught at the Universidad Autónoma (Department of Humanities) and at the University of New York in Spain. Besides being a professor and poet, Albornoz was by now a celebrated scholar. She had become a critical authority on the works of Miguel de Unamuno, Pablo Neruda, Cesar Vallejo, Rosalía de Castro, Federico García Lorca and particularly Antonio Machado, Juan Ramón Jiménez, and José Hierro. As already stated, her interest naturally extended into the work of exiled Spanish poets such as José Bergamín in Paris, Rafael Alberti in Argentina, and León Felipe and Juan Rejano in Mexico.

She was a permanent member on the board of judges for the International Antonio Machado Prize awarded every year in Collioure, France.

Throughout Spain—and in America, as well—de Albornoz taught many courses, participated in many congresses, colloquiums, and writers’ meetings; she collaborated toward cultural activities that dealt with scholarship and writing—such as the founding of journals, magazines, newspapers, radio programs, awards, and literary groups.

De Albornoz was called upon to introduce, preside, or read with emerging Spanish voices such as Claudio Rodríguez, José Manuel Caballero Bonald, José Ramón Ripoll, Fanny Rubio, Álvaro Salvador, the Cuban scholar José Olivio Jiménez, the American scholar Shirley Mangini, Juan Macías, and Luis García Montero.

== Death and legacy ==
On June 6, 1990, Aurora de Albornoz, at 64 years old, died in her apartment in Madrid. She was struck down by a cerebral hemorrhage while speaking on the phone with José Fernández de Albornoz, her American nephew. He along with Scott Hightower, the U.S. (Texas) poet living in Manhattan), had just visited with her.

Besides a vast amount of critical work in books, anthologies, and newspapers, de Albornoz had published eleven books of poetry. She was an innovative poet who incorporated prose poems, collage, and other modernistic techniques into her work. Her style has connections to the general movement of Spanish writing toward "fantastic realism." Her work is of particular interest as she spans through the Civil War, the Generation of '50, and the following generations giving voice to the experience of the exiliados––the exiles.

== Bibliography ==
Camblor Pandiella, Begoña, Bibliografía selecta de / sobre Aurora de Albornoz, in Palabras reunidas para Aurora de Albornoz, Oviedo, Universidad, 2007, pp. 183–187.

=== Works of Aurora de Albornoz ===
Original works

- Brazo de niebla, Santander, Hermanos Bedia, 1957. (1ª edición más breve, San Juan de Puerto Rico, Coayuco, 1955).
- Prosas de París, San Juan de Puerto Rico, (s.n.), 1959.
- Poemas para alcanzar un segundo, Madrid, Rialp, 1961.
- Por la primavera blanca. Fabulaciones, Madrid, Ínsula, 1962 (reedición Granada, Traspiés, 2005, con prólogo de Concepción González-Badía Fraga).
- Poemas (Verso y prosa), Cuadernos hispanoamericanos, 189 (septiembre 1965), pp. 283–290.
- En busca de esos niños en hilera, Santander, La isla de los ratones, 1967.
- Palabras desatadas, Málaga, Guadalhorce, 1975.
- Palabras reunidas (1967-1977), Madrid, Ayuso, 1983.
- Aventura, Turia, 12 (1989), pp. 39–41.
- Canciones de Guiomar, Madrid, Torremozas, 1990.
- Al sur del sur. Poemas, Cádiz, Ayuntamiento de San Roque, 1991.
- Cronilíricas. Collage, Madrid, Devenir, 1991.
- Pequeños poemas en prosa (inéd.).

Critical works

1) Studies

- La prehistoria de Antonio Machado, Puerto Rico, Universidad, 1961.
- Poesías de guerra de Antonio Machado, San Juan, Asomante, 1961.
- La presencia de Miguel de Unamuno en Antonio Machado, Madrid, Gredos, 1967.
- "Poesía de la España peregrina. Crónica incompleta", in El exilio español de 1939, vol. IV, Madrid, Taurus, 1977, pp. 11–108.
- Hacia la realidad creada, Barcelona, Península, 1979. [Includes: "Unos años de historia y literatura. Un libro de Alfonso Sastre", "de la España peregrina. Un libro de Lorenzo Varela", "La mirada de Juan Rejano", "Aproximación a la obra poética de José Hierro", "José Manuel Caballero Bonald: la palabra como alucinógeno", "Antonio Machado: De mi cartera, teoría y creación", "El "collage-anuncio" en Juan Ramón Jiménez", "En torno a un "nuevo libro" de Juan Ramón Jiménez", "La íntima lógica de César Vallejo (Trilce, LVIII)" and "Por los caminos de Rafael Alberti"] José Hierro, Madrid, Júcar, 1982.
- "Presencias de Antonio Machado en la España peregrina", Actas del Congreso Internacional "Antonio Machado hacia Europa", Madrid, Visor, 1993, pp. 233–241.

2) Prologues and editions

- "Prólogo", in Alfonso Sastre, Las noches lúgubres, Madrid, Júcar, 1973.
- Jiménez, Juan Ramón, Nueva antolojía, estudio preliminar y selección de Aurora de Albornoz, Barcelona, Península, 1973.
- "Un cuento de Gabriel García Márquez: El ahogado más hermoso del mundo", en VVAA, El comentario de textos 2. De Galdós a García Márquez, Madrid, Castalia, 1974, pp. 283–316.
- Jiménez, Juan Ramón, En el otro costado, 1ª edición preparada y prologada por Aurora de Albornoz, Madrid, Júcar, 1974.
- Machado, Antonio, Antología de su prosa, edición de Aurora de Albornoz, Madrid, Cuadernos para el diálogo, 1979.
- Hierro, José, Antología, selección e introducción de Aurora de Albornoz, Madrid, Visor, 1980.
- Neruda, Pablo, Poesías escogidas, prólogo de Aurora de Albornoz, Madrid, Aguilar, 1980.
- "Prólogo", en Jiménez, Juan Ramón, Arias tristes, Madrid, Taurus, 1981, pp. 9–45.
- Jiménez, Juan Ramón, Espacio, edición de Aurora de Albornoz, Madrid, Editora Nacional, 1982.
- Juan Ramón Jiménez, Madrid, Taurus, 1983. (Includes, además de una selección de artículos de autores diversos, su trabajo "El "collage-anuncio" en Juan Ramón Jiménez")
- Alberti, Rafael, Trece bandas y cuarenta y ocho estrellas, estudio preliminar de Aurora de Albornoz, Madrid, Espasa-Calpe
- ANDRÉS, ELENA, Chile en el corazón: homenaje a Pablo Neruda, Barcelona, Península, 1975.
- RODRÍGUEZ-LUIS, JULIO, Sensemayá: la poesía negra en el mundo hispanohablante (antología), Madrid, Orígenes, 1980.
- TORRE, GUILLERMO DE, Antonio Machado. Poesía y prosa, Buenos Aires, Cuadernos para el diálogo, 1964.

=== Works about de Albornoz ===
- ANÓNIMO, "Juan Ramón Jiménez. Nueva antolojía", Ínsula, 320-321 (Jul-Aug 1973), p. 33.
- CABALLERO BONALD, JOSÉ MANUEL, "Justicia de la memoria", La Torre, 21 (Jan-Mar 1992), pp. 5–8.
- CAMPOS, JORGE, "Balance y exposición de la poesía negra", Ínsula, 409 (Dec 1980), p. 11.
- CANO, JOSÉ LUIS, "Aurora de Albornoz: hacia la realidad creada", Ínsula, 400-401 (Mar-April 1980), pp. 20–21.
- _____, "Aurora de Albornoz: la poesía de José Hierro", Ínsula, 427 (June 1982), pp. 8–9.
- DÍAZ QUIÑONES, ARCADIO, "La tradición del exilio. Sobre Aurora de Albornoz", in La memoria rota, San Juan de Puerto Rico, Huracán, 1993, pp. 101–107.
- FERNÁNDEZ DE ALBORNOZ, JOSÉ LUIS, "Bibliografía de Aurora de Albornoz", La Torre, 21 (Jan-Mar 1992), pp. 175–177.
- GONZALEZ, RIGOBERTO, "Aurora de Albornoz," "Harriet" Poetry Foundation Blog Cite, posted Dec. 10, 2007.
- GONZÁLEZ-BADÍA FRAGA, CONCEPCIÓN, "Desde la realidad creada. La narración fabulada en Aurora de Albornoz", in Aurora de Albornoz, Por la primavera blanca, Granada, Traspiés, 2005, pp. 7–14.
- GULLÓN, RICARDO, "Aurora con Puerto Rico al fondo", in Aurora de Albornoz, Palabras reunidas (1967-1977), Madrid, Ayuso, 1983, pp. 9–13.
- HIERRO, JOSÉ, "Presentación", in Aurora de Albornoz, Canciones de Guiomar, Madrid, Torremozas, 1990, pp. 11–14.
- HIGHTOWER, SCOTT, "Tia Divina," en "My Diva" editado por Michael Montlack, Wisconsin, pp 85–90.
- IFACH, MARÍA GRACIA, "Aurora de Albornoz: Por la primavera blanca", Ínsula, 216-217 (Nov-Dec 1964), p. 20.
- JIMÉNEZ, JOSÉ OLIVIO, "Aurora de Albornoz: crítica y bolero", Revista de Estudios Hispánicos, 20 (1993), pp. 27–38.
- _____, "El negrismo poético en la tradición hispánica", Cuadernos hispanoamericanos, 367-368 (enero febrero 1981), pp. 381–387.
- LÓPEZ-SURIA, VIOLETA, "Aroma quieto de Aurora a Joshe", La Torre, 21 (Jan-Mar 1992), pp. 9–11.
- LUIS, LEOPOLDO DE, "Poemas para alcanzar un segundo", Papeles de Son Armadans, Madrid-Palma de Mallorca, April 1962, pp. 107–109.
- MIRÓ, EMILIO, "Aurora de Albornoz: En busca de esos niños en hilera", Ínsula, 257 (1968), p. 6.
- _____, "La recuperación de Juan Rejano", Ínsula, 395 (octubre 1979), p. 6.
- _____, "Arte y vida en la poesía de Aurora de Albornoz", Ínsula, 463 (junio 1985), p. 6.
- PÉREZ SÁNCHEZ, JOSÉ ANTONIO, "Aurora de Albornoz (1926-1990)", Luarca, Ayuntamiento de Valdés, 2007.
- PRAT, IGNACIO, "Juan Ramón Jiménez: En el otro costado", Ínsula, 342 (1974), p. 8.
- RODRÍGUEZ PADRÓN, JUSTO, "Aurora de Albornoz: una relectura de Espacio", Ínsula, 450 (mayo 1984), p. 18.
- RUBIO, FANNY, "Ante Canciones de Guiomar de Aurora de Albornoz", La Torre, 21 (Jan-Mar 1992), pp. 79–83.
- SALVADOR, ÁLVARO, "Palabras reunidas para Aurora de Albornoz", in Letra pequeña, Granada, Cuadernos del Vigía, 2003, pp. 101–106.
- SÁNCHEZ TORRE, LEOPOLDO, "Aurora de Albornoz: hacia la realidad creada", El eco de Luarca, 905 (julio 2000), pp. 22–23.
- UGALDE, SHARON KEEFE, "The poetry of Aurora de Albornoz and Gendered Poetic Traditions", Letras peninsulares, 11.2 (1998), pp. 569–583.
- VILLA PASTUR, JESÚS, "Aurora de Albornoz: Poemas para alcanzar un segundo", Archivum, XIII (1963), pp. 368–370.
- ZAVALA, IRIS, La otra mirada del siglo XX. La mujer en la España contemporánea, Madrid, La esfera de los libros, 2004, pp. 311–313 y passim.
