= Pedro Rico =

Spanish Republican politician

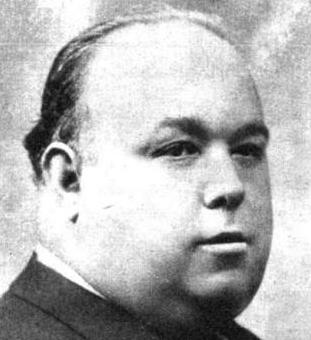

Pedro Rico López (1888 – 1957) was a Spanish Republican politician. He served as mayor of Madrid from 1931 to 1934 and again in 1936, during the Second Spanish Republic.

The Spanish Civil War broke out in July 1936, and Madrid was besieged by Nationalists. Rico left his office and headed towards Valencia in November. He was intercepted at Tarancón by anarchists, decried as a coward and sent back to the capital, where he sought asylum in the Mexican Embassy. He spent the rest of the war in Paris, Brussels and Barcelona before the defeat of the Republic.

Rico lived in France for most of his exile, apart from attending the Cortes republicanas in Mexico in 1945. During World War II, he was persecuted by the Vichy France authorities. He was attacked by Francoist Spain for his alleged corruption and obesity, and his death at age 69 was barely mentioned by the regime's press.

== Biography ==
=== Early life and terms as mayor ===
Born in Madrid, Rico graduated with a law degree in 1910. He became active in republicanism and joined the Republican Action group led by Manuel Azaña. He was elected mayor of Madrid in the 1931 Spanish local elections that coincided with the proclamation of the Second Spanish Republic.

Rico was removed from office in October 1934 as the Asturian miners' strike broke out. In February 1936, he returned to being mayor after the Popular Front won the national election. Weighing 130 kg, he was known for enjoying the limelight, commissioning Agustín Segura to paint him wearing a sash of the flag of the Second Spanish Republic. He also attended the 1936 final of football's Copa del Presidente de la República (now Copa del Rey) in Valencia, on the invitation of Rafael Sánchez Guerra, president of Madrid CF (now Real Madrid CF), and put on celebrations for his winning local team.

=== Civil War and exile ===
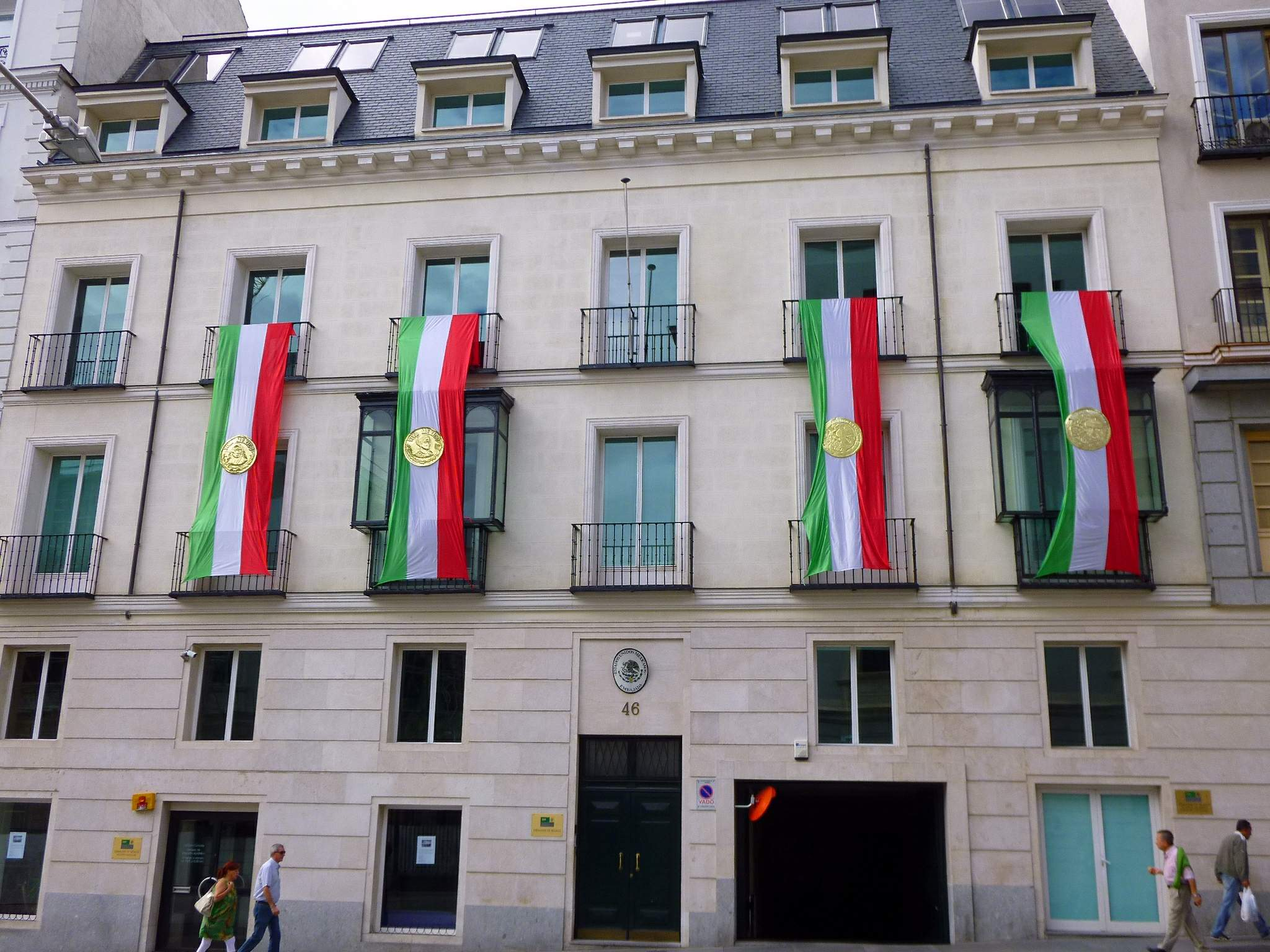
Rico sought asylum in the Embassy of Mexico, Madrid where most other refugees supported the Nationalist faction.

In July 1936, the Spanish Civil War broke out, and Nationalist rebels besieged Madrid. He expelled all monarchists from the City Council of Madrid, though most were outside the city or already arrested by the Republican authorities. On 6 November, the Republican government relocated to Valencia, with Rico alongside them, delegating his office to his deputy Cayetano Redondo Aceña. At Tarancón in the Province of Cuenca, the convoy was stopped by anarchist militiamen of the Confederación Nacional del Trabajo (CNT); they chastised Rico as a coward for leaving Madrid during the Francoist advance, beat him and sent him back to the capital. Some Nationalist and French newspapers reported that he had been executed in this encounter, while Republican press avoided the subject entirely.

The day after his failed escape, Rico sought asylum in the Mexican Embassy. He was one of 56 people to take refuge there that month, most others being opponents of the Republic, including future Francoist prime minister Luis Carrero Blanco. By December 1936, food was running short in Madrid and Mexico began to evacuate the refugees, taking Rico to Valencia on 20 January 1937 and housing him in property owned by the country. By February, he was in France and in 1937 he lived in Brussels, Belgium.

Rico had resigned his seat in the Cortes republicanas for the Republican Left before fleeing to France. In February 1938, he observed a meeting of the Cortes at the Sanctuary of the Virgin of Montserrat in Barcelona. As the Catalan capital fell to Francisco Franco in January 1939, Rico fled back into France with other Republicans. Persecuted by the authorities of Vichy France, he again sought Mexico's aid in Marseille and was listed for evacuation to the Latin American country, but removed from the list for unknown reasons.

=== Later life and death ===
In January 1943, Francoist Spain banned Rico from returning to the country for 15 years and fined him 10 million Spanish pesetas. The new regime's press continuously attacked him for alleged corruption as a lawyer and mayor. By the end of World War II he was living in Aix-en-Provence and in September 1945 he moved to Mexico, arriving in Nuevo Laredo via the United States in November to attend the Republican Cortes in exile. Returning to France, he gave university lectures on the Republic and published a book on its flag in 1950.

Rico died in Aix, aged 69. His death was barely reported by the new Spanish regime, but his obituary appeared in ABC at the behest of his son. A funeral was permitted at the Church of Las Calatravas. A street in Madrid, near the M-30 motorway, was named after him.

In 2021, Rico's art collection was returned to his two grandchildren, under the Historical Memory Law. The paintings had been taken to Asturias by Franco as spoils of war.
