= Cayetano Redondo Aceña =

Spanish politician, typographer, journalist and Esperantist

Cayetano Redondo
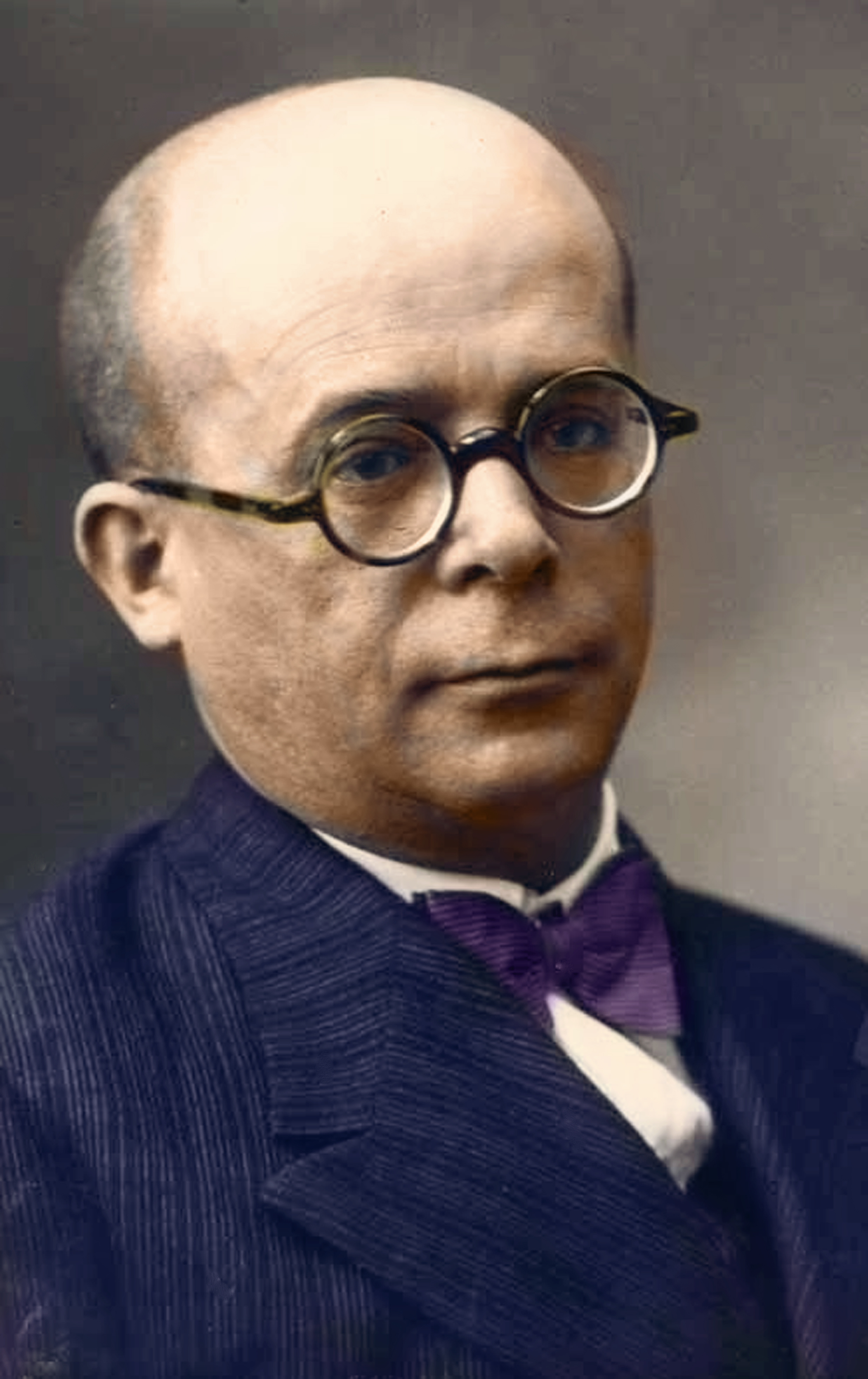

Mayor of Madrid
- In office 8 November 1936 – 23 April 1937
- Preceded by: Pedro Rico
- Succeeded by: Rafael Henche

Member of the Republican Cortes
- In office July 1931 – October 1933
- Constituency: Segovia

Personal details
- Born: 5 August 1888 Segovia
- Died: 21 May 1940 (aged 51) Madrid
- Party: Spanish Socialist Workers' Party
- Occupation: Politician, journalist, typographer, Esperantist

Cayetano Redondo Aceña (7 August 1888 – 21 May 1940) was a Spanish politician, typographer, journalist and Esperantist. A member of the Spanish Socialist Workers' Party, he served as Mayor of Madrid from November 1936 to May 1937, during the Spanish Civil War.

== Biography ==
Born on 7 August 1888 in Segovia, he moved young to Madrid with his family. He worked as typographer. He became a member of the Unión General de Trabajadores (UGT) in 1905. In 1918, Redondo was leader of the National Federation of Juventudes Socialistas, the youth wing of the Spanish Socialist Workers' Party (PSOE). He worked for several political papers, including El Socialista.

In 1931, he was elected as Madrid municipal councillor at the April 1931 municipal election, in representation of Chamberí. He was entrusted with the municipal government area of Social Work and with the responsibility over the district of Universidad. Later in the year, Redondo was elected on a PSOE platform as deputy to the Constituent Cortes of the Second Spanish Republic in representation of the province of Segovia at the 1931 general election.

A noted esperantist, he was the Spanish representative at the Summer School organised by the Austrian Socialist Esperantist League in 1927, and he also delivered the opening speech of the 9th Spanish Congress of Esperanto in 1932.

After the start of the Spanish Civil War, at the height of the attacks and bombings carried by the Francoist faction on Madrid, Mayor Pedro Rico fled for Valencia hidden in a car boot. Redondo was elected his replacement on 8 November, although the decisions of the Defence Council of Madrid largely determined the action of the municipal government. Redondo left the post of mayor in April 1937, replaced by Rafael Henche.

After Madrid fell, Redondo was captured by Francoist forces and executed by a firing squad at the walls of the Cementerio de la Almudena on 21 May 1940. Buried in a mass grave, his remains were later moved and buried together with those of José Gómez Osorio, the last Republican civil governor of Madrid, shot months earlier, thanks to the concern of the family of the latter. His grave is near the place chosen in memory of "The Thirteen Roses."
