= Concha de Albornoz =

Exiled Spanish intellectual

Concha de Albornoz (April 29, 1900 – February 1972) was a Spanish intellectual, an exiliada of the Spanish Civil War, and among those considered to be the earliest part of the modern feminist movement of Spain.

María de la Concepción (Concha) de Albornoz was the daughter of the Spanish writer and Second Republic political statesman Alvaro de Albornoz y Liminiana and his wife Amalia Salas Abella Fuertes. Her primary family (including her brother Álvarito and his wife Maria Araceli) was driven into exile in Mexico in 1939 by the Franco Government of Spain.

== Years before the Spanish Civil War ==
Albornoz was born on April 29, 1900, in Luarca, Asturias. In 1918, while studying, she met and became friends with Rosa Chacel. Later, Albornoz married Ángel Segovia Burillo. April 1922, she was a witness at the wedding of Rosa Chacel and the painter Timoteo Perez-Rubio. In 1927, both couples lived in the same building off the plaza Tirso de Molina in Madrid. In 1930, Albornoz stood as the god-mother at the baptism of Carlos Perez Chacel. The summer of 1936, she and her friend, the poet Luis Cernuda, went to Paris to serve as secretaries to her father Álvaro Albornoz y Liminiana who was appointed the Ambassador to France for the Second Republic Provisional Government. In 1937, Albornoz and Burillo separated; years later they attained a final legal divorce. (Burillo's legal representation was Victoria Kent.)

== Years of the Spanish Civil War and exile ==
During the following turbulent political years of the Second Republic and the ensuing Civil War, Albornoz lived in Paris and Greece. Chacel joined her in Greece as a fellow guest of Maximo Jose Kahn. The two visited with Nikos Kazantzakis, and eventually took up residency in Greece. Eventually, the entourage of Spanish exilios had to leave Greece; Albornoz went to Ascona (Switzerland) and briefly visited Paris where she was reunited temporarily with Chacel, Chacel’s son Carlos, the Kahns, and the Kazantzakis. In 1939, Albornoz traveled to Cuba (until Dec. 1940). During this short stay she taught Spanish literature at the Escuela Libre de La Havana and there she became friends with Lezama Lima. January 25, 1940, Albornoz and her Spanish-born parents immigrated to Mexico to join Alvaro and his wife, María Araceli de la Escosura Beckar. There she became friends with other exilios, among them Ramón Gaya, noted painter from Murcia.

== Years in the United States and returning to Europe ==
In 1944, Albornoz became a professor at Mount Holyoke College in Massachusetts, and an influential contact for many Spanish exiled scholars and intellectuals. While at Mount Holyoke one particular encounter was noteworthy: Albornoz was introduced to Eleanor Roosevelt. When the First Lady asked Albornoz, "When is Franco going to leave?" Albornoz replied, "Whenever you want." Roosevelt, a bit disconcerted, responded with a smile.

Cernuda was guest professor at Mount Holyoke. When he returned to Mexico, Albornoz frequently joined him in Mexico. She also became friends with Clara James.

In 1952, Albornoz, for the first time after her exile, returned to Europe with Clara James and Ramón Gaya. They were joined by Juan Gil-Albert Simón. The entourage then visited Venice, Florence, Padua, Vicenza, Verona, and Rome. In 1956, Albornoz, Gil-Albert, and Gaya met in Paris. Albornoz and Gaya continued to Rome where they visited Maria Zambrano in her apartment at the Piazza del Popolo. Oct. 1959, after spending summer vacation in Japan, Concha met Rosa Chacel in New York. The visit was a celebration as Chacel had just received a Guggenheim to write "Saturnal". Albornoz and her cousin Severo Ochoa (Ochoa's sister was Albornoz's paternal aunt) had encouraged Chacel to apply.

== Final years ==
In September 1960, Albornoz suffered a physical attack. It was the first symptom that years later in Mexico would cause her cerebral paralysis, which, in turn, would lead to her death in Mexico City, Mexico in February 1972.

She was also a friend of the poets Miguel Hernández and Manuel Altolaguirre.

== Sources ==
- Cernuda, Luis, "Years of Exile (1938-1963)", Barcelona, Tusquets, 2008.
- Kahn, Máximo José, "Apocalipsis hispánica," Mexico City, Editorial America, 1942.
- Kazantzakis, Nikos, "The Selected Letters of Nikos Kazantzakis," Peter Bien, Princeton, Princdton University Press, 2012.
- Mangini, Shirley, Las Modernas de Madrid, Las grandes intelectuales españolas de la vanguardia, Barcelona, Peninsula, 2001, pp. 157–158.
- Valender, James, "Luis Cernuda: Álbum, biografía," Madrid, Publications of the Student Residencia, 2002.
