= Republican Alliance =

- Aliazana Republicana
- Abbreviation: AR
- Established: February 11, 1926; 100 years ago
- Dissolved: 1931; 95 years ago
- Location: Spain

The Republican Alliance (Spanish: Alianza Republicana) was a Spanish political platform that brought together several republican parties and groups during the dictatorship of Primo de Rivera. The alliance was formed on 11 February 1926, and consisted of four political groups ranging in various types of republicanism:

- the Radical Republican Party of Alejandro Lerroux, founded in 1908, had distanced itself from its original anti-clericalism and anti-Catalanism stance and became a moderate party;
- the Federal Republican Party, a historic republican party lacking in militancy, which soon left the alliance;
- the Republican Action Group, predecessor of Republican Action, formed in 1925, headed by Manuel Azaña and included young professionals and intellectuals (such as José Giral, Luis Jiménez de Asúa, and Ramón Pérez de Ayala), coming mostly from the Ateneo de Madrid;
- and the Catalan Republican Party, founded in 1917 by Marcelino Domingo and Lluís Companys, which constituted the left wing of political Catalanism.
- Intellectuals including Vicente Blasco Ibáñez, Miguel de Unamuno, Antonio Machado, and Gregorio Marañón also collaborated with the alliance.

Although united by their common opposition to the monarchy and dictatorship, the group was a politically varied. In December 1929, the most left-wing sectors of the alliance, led by Álvaro de Albornoz and Marcelino Domingo, separated from the alliance to create the Radical Socialist Republican Party. The creation of the Radical Socialist Republican Party encouraged Republican Action to become a political party in the early months of 1930, remaining within the alliance despite its evident political disagreement with the radicals of Lerroux. On 14 May 1930, the alliance and the radical socialists formed a revolutionary committee, eventually leading to the establishment and consolidation of the Second Spanish Republic. Several local republican groups joined this cause, including the Autonomous Galician Republican Organization led by Santiago Casares Quiroga and Antón Villar Ponte or the Autonomist Republican Union Party led by Sigfrido Blasco-Ibáñez.

On 17 August 1930, Azaña and Lerroux, representing the alliance, participated in the assemblage of the Pact of San Sebastián, which would lead to the formation of the Provisional Government of the Republic. The Republican Alliance was dissolved after the proclamation of the republic, although in the 1931 elections, the Republican–Socialist Conjunction was presented in some provinces with the presence of the alliance. The constitutional debates, which strengthened the ties between socialists, radical socialists, and Republican Action, forced Lerroux's radicals and progressives to leave the alliance, leading to the formal end of the Republican Alliance.

== See also ==
- Republican–Socialist Conjunction
- Grupo de Acción Republicana

== Bibliography ==
- Gil Pecharromán, Julio (1989). La Segunda República (in Spanish). Vol. 16th. Madrid. p. 220. ISBN 84-7679-128-3.
- Net (2012). "Aliança Republicana". Enciclopèdia d'Eivissa i Formentera (in Catalan). ISBN 978-8476322369.
