= Antonio Marsá =

Spanish politician and jurist

Antonio Marsá Bragado

Spanish Attorney General
- In office 20 September 1933 – 26 May 1934
- President: Niceto Alcalá-Zamora
- Preceded by: José Oriol Anguera de Sojo
- Succeeded by: Lorenzo Gallardo González

Personal details
- Born: 1877 Barcelona, Spain
- Died: 12 October 1965 (aged 87–88) Madrid, Spain
- Party: Catalan Republican Party; Radical Republican Party
- Other political affiliations: Federal Democratic Republican Party; Republican Union
- Education: Central University of Madrid
- Occupation: Politician, lawyer, jurist

Antonio Marsá Bragado (1877 - 12 October 1965) was a Spanish politician who served as the Spanish Attorney General during the presidency of Niceto Alcalá-Zamora.

== Biography ==
Marsá studied law in Madrid and Barcelona. In his early political years, he was active with the Federal Democratic Republican Party and later the Republican Union. In 1905, he was elected by the Republican Union as the health councilor of the Barcelona City Council.

In September 1933, during the first premiership of Lerroux, Marsá served as the Attorney General of the State. At this time, he also held various positions within the Radical Republican Party. In 1934, he was appointed a permanent member of the Council of State by the Samper government. He was removed from office after Francisco Franco's military uprising in July 1936 and went into hiding in Barcelona until the city was taken over by the nationalists in January 1939. He returned to Madrid in 1942, where he was accused of being a Freemason and was exiled to Pamplona for three years.
