= 1931 Barcelona City Council election =

- 12 April 1931

All 50 seats in the Barcelona City Council 26 seats needed for a majority
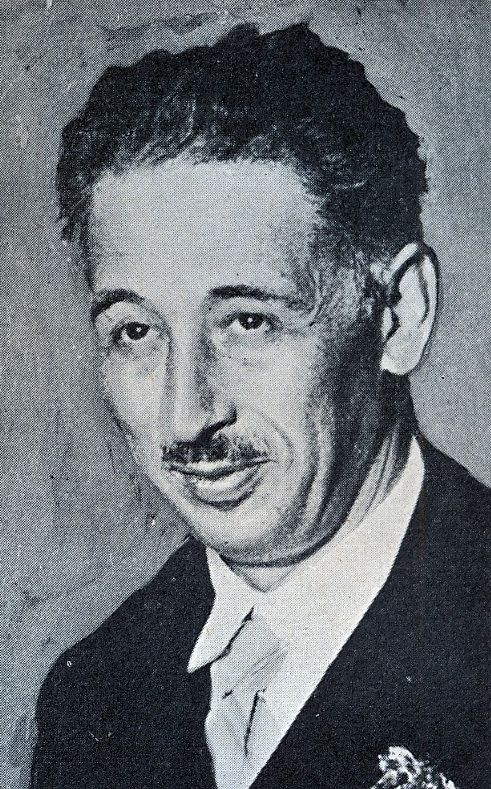

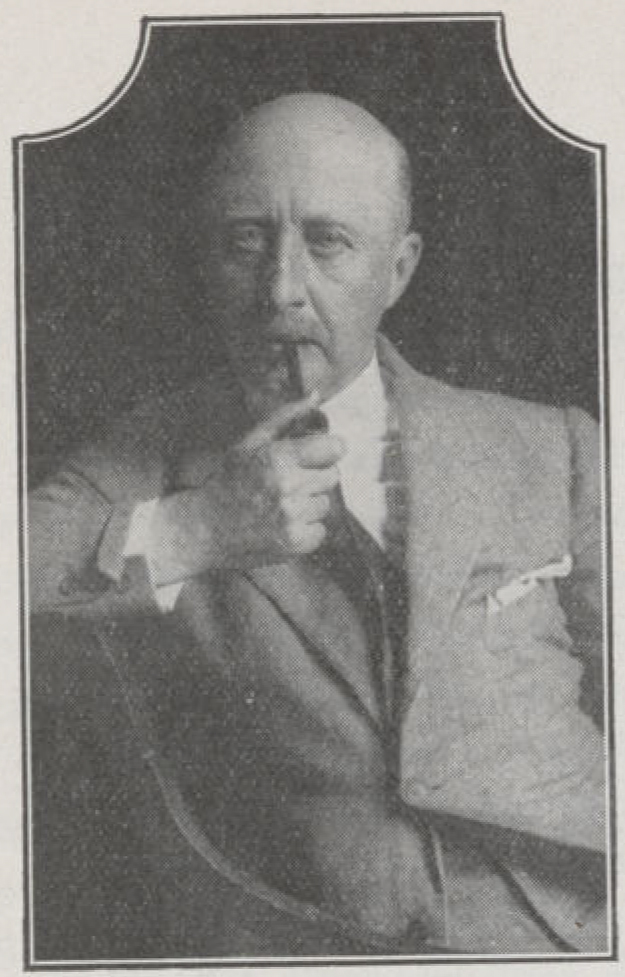
	First party	Second party
Leader	Lluís Companys	Joan Antoni Güell i López
Party	ERC	Regionalist League
Leader since	1931	1930
Seats won	25	12
Popular vote	42,762	30,056
Percentage	30.7%	21.6%
- Results by district
Mayor before election
Joan Antoni Güell i López
Regionalist League
Elected Mayor
Jaume Aiguader i Miró
Republican Left of Catalonia

The 1931 Barcelona City Council election was held on Sunday, 12 April 1931, to elect the Barcelona City Council, the unicameral local legislature of the municipality of Barcelona. This was the first free election after the Dictatorship of Primo de Rivera. At stake were all 50 seats in the City Council, determining the Mayor of Barcelona. The election was perceived as a plebiscite on Spanish Monarchy. The results lead to the Second Spanish Republic.

== Electoral system ==
The number of seats of each council was determined by the population count. According to the 1877 municipal law, the population-seat relationship on each municipality was to be established on the following scale:

Population	Seats	Population	Seats	Population	Seats
<500	6	16,001–18,000	21	55,001–60,000	36
501–800	7	18,001–20,000	22	60,001–65,000	37
801–1,000	8	20,001–22,000	23	65,001–70,000	38
1,001–2,000	9	22,001–24,000	24	70,001–75,000	39
2,001–3,000	10	24,001–26,000	25	75,001–80,000	40
3,001–4,000	11	26,001–28,000	26	80,001–85,000	41
4,001–5,000	12	28,001–30,000	27	85,001–90,000	42
5,001–6,000	13	30,001–32,000	28	90,001–95,000	43
6,001–7,000	14	32,001–34,000	29	95,001–100,000	44
7,001–8,000	15	34,001–36,000	30	100,001–120,000	45
8,001–9,000	16	36,001–38,000	31	120,001–140,000	46
9,001–10,000	17	38,001–40,000	32	140,001–160,000	47
10,001–12,000	18	40,001–45,000	33	160,001–180,000	48
12,001–14,000	19	45,001–50,000	34	180,001–200,000	49
14,001–16,000	20	50,001–55,000	35	>200,001	50

The 1907 election law established that councillors should be elected in districts consisting of 4 members, although 3 to 7 member districts were also allowed. Voters had to choose multiple candidates using limited voting, which allows a voter to vote for fewer candidates than members have to be elected. Candidates winning a plurality of votes in each district were elected. If the number of candidates was equal or fewer than the number of seats to be filled, candidates were automatically proclaimed without an election. Voting was compulsory, but not enforced, and on the basis of universal manhood suffrage, with males over twenty-five and at least a two-year residency in a municipality required to vote. Mayors were elected indirectly by the city or town council on the first session after the election.

== Results ==
← Summary of the 12 April 1931 Barcelona City Council election results →
Party	Vote			Seats	
Party	Votes	%	±pp	Won	+/−
Republican Left (ERC-USC)	42,762	30,74	−	25	−
Regionalist League (LR)	30,056	21.61	−	12	−
Republican-Socialist Coalition (PRR-PSOE)	28,561	20.53	−	12	−
Autonomous Republicans (Rep.A)	5,322	3.83	−	1	−
Republican Catalan Action (ACR)	18,132	13.04	−	0	−
Spanish Patriotic Union (UP)	3,952	2.84	−	0	−
Liberal Party (PL)	2,445	1.76	−	0	−
Independents	2,356	1.69	−	0	−
Dissident radicals (Rad.D)	2,270	1.63	−	0	−
Workers and Peasants' Bloc (BOC)	1,707	1.23	−	0	−
Traditionalist Communion (TC)	1,216	0.87	−	0	−
Social Republican (Rep.S)	187	0.13	−	0	−
Radio Communist (Com.Rad)	129	0.09	−	0	−
Total	139,095	100.00		50	−
Source: La Veu de Catalunya, 14/04/1931 p. 4

Vote share
ERC-USC	30.74%
LR	21.61%
PRR-PSOE	20.53%
ACR	13.04%
Rep.A	3.83%
UP	2.84%
Others	7.41%

City council seats
ERC-USC	50.00%
LR	24.00%
PRR-PSOE	24.00%
Rep.A	2.00%

=== Results by district ===
Constituency	ERC-USC		LR		PRR-PSOE		ACR		Other monarchists		Rep.A		Other republicans		Indep.	
Constituency	%	S	%	S	%	S	%	S	%	S	%	S	%	S	%	S
I Barceloneta−Ciutat Vella	21.0	−	30.4	3	30.3	2	14.1	−	0.0	−	3.1	−	1.2	−	0.0	−
II Poble-sec−Montjuïc	36.5	3	13.9	−	28.0	2	12.9	−	8.3	−	0.0	−	0.4	−	0.0	−
III Les Corts−Sarrià	23.9	1	29.7	2	7.7	−	23.0	−	14.0	−	0.0	−	0.1	−	1.7	−
IV Dreta de l'Eixample	24.3	2	30.4	4	13.3	−	16.1	−	9.9	−	0.8	−	5.2	−	0.0	−
V Raval	28.9	4	13.6	−	22.3	2	14.3	−	4.4	−	0.1	−	16.4	−	0.0	−
VI Esquerra de l'Eixample	33.1	3	28.0	1	12.4	−	17.2	−	7.0	−	2.2	−	0.0	−	0.0	−
VII Hostafrancs−Sants	41.8	4	12.5	−	21.9	2	9.9	−	2.0	−	1.4	−	1.9	−	8.5	−
VIII Gràcia	33.0	3	24.7	2	22.3	−	13.2	−	4.2	−	1.2	−	0.2	−	1.3	−
IX Sant Andreu−Horta	36.7	4	13.6	−	14.9	1	7.6	−	8.2	−	17.9	1	1.0	−	0.0	−
X Sant Martí	24.3	1	24.3	−	29.1	3	7.0	−	0.0	−	9.5	−	0.6	−	5.2	−
Total	30.7	25	21.6	12	20.5	12	13.0	−	5.5	−	3.8	1	3.1	−	1.7	−

=== Councillors elected ===
- Republican Left of Catalonia (ERC-USC)
  - Jaume Aguadé i Miró
  - Amadeu Aragay i Daví
  - Josep Armengol de Llano
  - Josep Bertran de Quintaua
  - Rafael Campalaus i Puig
  - Joan Casanellas
  - Joan Casanovas i Maristany
  - Pere Comas i Calvet
  - Lluís Companys i Jover
  - Francesc Costa i Martin
  - Josep Duran i Guàrdia
  - Josep Escofet i Andreu
  - Joan Lluhí i Vallescà
  - Ramon Marlés i Fanés
  - Miquel Ollé i Jové
  - Domènec Pla i Blanco
  - Lluís Puig i Monné
  - Enric Sànchez i Silva
  - Jaume Vàchier i Pallé
  - Salvador Vallverdú i Parxachs
  - Joaquim Ventalló i Vergés
  - Ernest Ventós i Casadevall
  - Antoni Vilalta i Vidal
  - Jaume Vinyals i Garrich
  - Joaquim Xirau i Palau
- Regionalist League (LR)
  - Josep Alomar i Estadas
  - Frederic Amat i Arnau
  - Joan Antoni Güell i Lòpez
  - Andreu Bausili i Sanromà
  - Frederic Brasó i Villaret
  - Josep Cabré i Gelabert
  - Martí Casals i Galceran
  - Ferran de Sagarra i de Castellarnau
  - Amadeu Llopart i Vilalta
  - Josep Nonell i Pujol
  - Joaquim Pellicena i Camacho
  - Francesc Puig i Alfonso
- Republican-Socialist Coalition (PRR-PSOE)
  - Felip de Solà i Cañizares
  - Joan Domènech i Buscà
  - Casimir Giralt i Bullich
  - Joan Grisó i Descàrrega
  - Frederic Herèdia i Valls
  - Pere Huguet i Puigderrajols
  - Josep Jové i Sarroca
  - Mateu Ruiz i Morlan
  - Pere Salvat i Pie
  - Josep Samblancat i Salanova
  - Jesús Ulled i Altemir
  - Abel Velilla i Sarazola
- Autonomous Republican (Rep.A)
  - Manuel Santamaria i Gonzàlez
