= Alfonsism =

Spanish monarchist movement

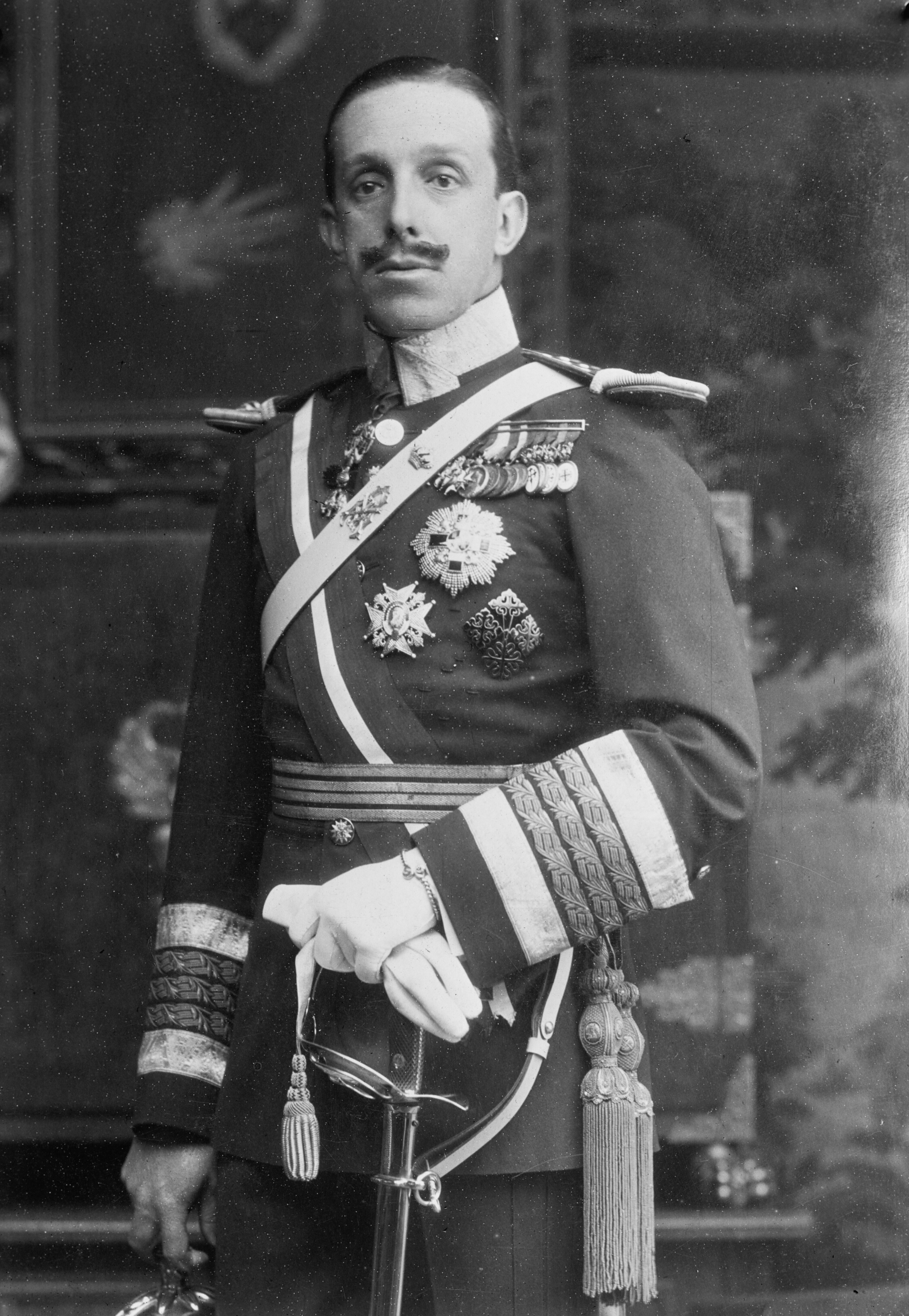
Alfonso XIII, after whom Alfonsism is named

The term Alfonsism (Spanish: Alfonsismo) refers to the movement in Spanish monarchism that supported the restoration of Alfonso XIII as King of Spain after the foundation of the Second Spanish Republic in 1931. The Alfonsists competed with the rival monarchists, the Carlists, for the throne of Spain.

== Background ==
Since the crisis of the dynastic conservatism in the 1910s, the authoritarian accents within the former political camp had increased, with a new generation of Maurist politicians bringing ideas of corporativism, integral nationalism, economic interventionism and political Catholicism. After 1923, the dictatorship of Primo de Rivera espoused as ideology a mix of authoritarian and bureaucratic conservatism with some traditionalist trappings. As the very same Alfonso XIII began to identify with the new regime, the remains of the liberal-conservative tradition largely distanced from the figure of the King or even from the monarchy altogether. After the forced resignation of Primo de Rivera in 1930, the authoritarian wing largely gathered into the National Monarchist Union.

== History ==
After the overthrow of the monarchy of Alfonso XIII in 1931, the supporters of the later formed the Renovación Española in 1933, a monarchist political party split from Popular Action, which held considerable economic influence and had close supporters in the Spanish army. Alfonsists adapted authoritarian elements from Italian Fascism, Action Française, and Portuguese Integralism into their cause. Renovación Española did not, however, manage to become a mass political movement. The Alfonsists received little support outside of their clique of well-established supporters, while their rivals, the Carlists, soared to become a mass movement in Spain. Renovación Española cooperated with the fascist Falange party led by José Antonio Primo de Rivera, hoping to coopt it as a tool for the party's objectives. In 1937, during the Spanish Civil War, the Alfonsists of Renovación Española merged alongside the Falange, the Carlist traditionalists, and CEDA under Francisco Franco's directive to form a united National Movement, the FET y de las JONS.
