= 1931 Spanish local elections =

The 1931 Spanish local elections were held on 12 April throughout all municipalities in Spain to elect 80,472 councillors. The elections were perceived as a plebiscite on the monarchy of Alfonso XIII. After republican parties and their allies came away with a convincing victory, the king left the country and the Second Spanish Republic was proclaimed. A provisional government was formed shortly thereafter, with national elections scheduled for later in the year.

== Background ==
Since 1923, Spain had been a dictatorship under Miguel Primo de Rivera with the approval of Alfonso XIII, the reigning monarch at the time. After the fall of the dictatorship of Miguel Primo de Rivera and the failure of his successor, Dámaso Berenguer, to establish another dictatorship, the new cabinet appointed by the king in 1931 decided to hold new local elections for the first time in nine years. Although they were local elections, they were perceived as a plebiscite on the Spanish monarchy, as no national elections or polls had been held since 1923.

== Electoral system ==
The number of seats of each council was determined by the population count. According to the 1877 municipal law, the population-seat relationship on each municipality was to be established on the following scale:

Population	Seats	Population	Seats	Population	Seats
<500	6	16,001–18,000	21	55,001–60,000	36
501–800	7	18,001–20,000	22	60,001–65,000	37
801–1,000	8	20,001–22,000	23	65,001–70,000	38
1,001–2,000	9	22,001–24,000	24	70,001–75,000	39
2,001–3,000	10	24,001–26,000	25	75,001–80,000	40
3,001–4,000	11	26,001–28,000	26	80,001–85,000	41
4,001–5,000	12	28,001–30,000	27	85,001–90,000	42
5,001–6,000	13	30,001–32,000	28	90,001–95,000	43
6,001–7,000	14	32,001–34,000	29	95,001–100,000	44
7,001–8,000	15	34,001–36,000	30	100,001–120,000	45
8,001–9,000	16	36,001–38,000	31	120,001–140,000	46
9,001–10,000	17	38,001–40,000	32	140,001–160,000	47
10,001–12,000	18	40,001–45,000	33	160,001–180,000	48
12,001–14,000	19	45,001–50,000	34	180,001–200,000	49
14,001–16,000	20	50,001–55,000	35	>200,001	50

The 1907 election law established that councillors should be elected in districts consisting of 4 members, although 3 to 7 member districts were also allowed. Voters had to choose multiple candidates using limited voting, which allows a voter to vote for fewer candidates than members have to be elected. Candidates winning a plurality of votes in each district were elected. If the number of candidates was equal or fewer than the number of seats to be filled, candidates were automatically proclaimed without an election. Voting was compulsory and on the basis of universal manhood suffrage, with males over twenty-five and at least a two-year residency in a municipality required to vote. Mayors were elected indirectly by the city or town council on the first session after the election.

== Results ==
=== Overall results ===
Winners in number of seats by province and provincial capital. Republicans, socialists, and communists: <50% >50% Monarchists: <50% >50% Other: <50% >50%

The results shown were extracted from the 1931 Spanish Statistical Annuary.

Candidates	Seats					
Candidates	Total seats		Automatically proclaimed		Elected	
Candidates	No.	%	No.	%	No.	%
Republicans	34,368	42.71	13,940	46.77	20,428	40.32
Socialists	4,813	5.98	887	2.98	3,926	7.75
Communists	67	0.08	10	0.03	57	0.11
Monarchists	19,035	23.65	6,065	20.35	12,970	25.60
Other	15,198	18.89	6,043	20.28	9,155	18.07
Unknown	6,991	8.69	2,859	9.59	4,132	8.16
Total	80,472	100.00	29,804	100.00	50,668	100.00

Results showed a win of republicans by a large margin in Asturias, Aragon, and Catalonia. Monarchists got their best results in the Balearic Islands, Andalusia, and Extremadura. The republicans had a majority in more than four-fifths of the provincial capitals. In the city of Barcelona, the largest city by that time, they obtained more than the 75% of the seats. These were the results in the province capitals plus Ceuta and Melilla:

Municipality	Seats	Republicans					Monarchists		
Municipality	Seats	Rep	Soc	Com	Other	Total	Mon	Other	Total
A Coruña	39	33	1			34	5		5
Albacete	32	14	4			18	14		14
Alicante	39	15	14			29	10		10
Almería	35	24	4			28	7		7
Ávila	19	8				8	11		11
Badajoz	33	11	10			21	12		12
Barcelona	50	34	4			38		12 (Note: Regionalist League of Catalonia)	12
Bilbao [es]	46	12	12			35	3	8 (Note: Basque Nationalist Party)	11
Burgos	30	10	4			14	16		16
Cáceres	24	14				14	10		10
Cádiz	40					0	40		40
Castelló de la Plana	30	24	2			26		4	4
Ceuta	35	16	10			26		9	9
Ciudad Real	24	4	12			16	8		8
Cuenca	21	6	5			11	10		10
Córdoba	44	19	8			27	17		17
Girona	23	12	3			15	3	5 (Note: Regionalist League of Catalonia)	8
Granada	45	17	18			35	6	4	10
Guadalajara	20	6	8			14	5	1	6
Huelva	33	13	10			23	2	8	10
Huesca	20	14				14	4	2	6
Jaén	32	11	11			22	10		10
Las Palmas de Gran Canaria	39	8	8			16	20	3	23
León	26	11	7			18	7	1	8
Lleida	30	23				23		7 (Note: Regionalist League of Catalonia)	7
Logroño	28	17	3			20	7 (Note: 5 liberal democrats and 2 centrists)	1 (Note: "Catholic")	8
Lugo	28	3	4			7	21		21
Madrid [es]	50	16	15			31	18	1	19
Málaga	47	31	5	1		37	10		10
Melilla	32	19	9			28		4	4
Murcia	46	18	4	2		24	19	3	22
Ourense	23	6	4	3		13		10	10
Oviedo [es]	40	27				27		13	13
Palencia	24	11	5			16	8		8
Palma	41	5	4			9	27	5	32
Pamplona	29	9	6			15	14		14
Pontevedra	27	7	2	2	5	16	9	2	11
Salamanca	31	14	5			19	12		12
San Sebastián	39	18	7			25	8	6 (Note: Basque Nationalist Party)	14
Santa Cruz de Tenerife	36	22	3			25	11		11
Santander	40	16	9			25	15		15
Segovia	21	8	3			11	10		10
Seville	50	25	8			33		17	17
Soria	17	7	1			8	7	2	9
Tarragona	28	17	2			19	6	3 (Note: Regionalist League of Catalonia and an independent (Marquess of Muller))	9
Teruel	19	7	5			12	7		7
Toledo [es]	25	12	5			17	3	5	8
Valencia [es]	50	32				32	9	9	18
Valladolid	44	16	10			26	18		18
Vitoria	31	16	3			19	4 (Note: Traditionalist Communion)	8 (Note: 3 seats won by the PNV, 2 seats won by "The Commercial Defence", 2 seats won by "Catholic Independents" and 1 seat won by a "Catholic")	12
Zamora	22	7	7	1		15	5	2	7
Zaragoza	47	26	6			32	15		15
Total	1,724	767	290	20	11	1,088	468	168	636

=== Catalonia ===
Majority of seats in the judicial districts capitals: Monarchists Republicans No data

Largest party by judicial district capital: ERC PCR PRR PRDF Other republicans LR Other monarchists

Candidates	Seats					
Candidates	Total seats		Automatically proclaimed		Elected	
Candidates	No.	%	No.	%	No.	%
Republicans	6,001	68.42	2,782	71.65	3,219	65.86
Socialists	133	1.52	19	0.49	114	2.33
Communists	10	0.11	2	0.05	8	0.16
Regionalist League	1,773	20.21	759	19.55	1,014	20.74
Monarchists	399	4.55	120	3.09	279	5.71
Unknown	455	5.19	201	5.18	254	5.20
	8,771	100.00	3,883	100.00	4,888	100.00

The results showed very favourable results for the republicans in Catalonia. They won every major city (cities over 10,000 and capitals of judicial districts) except for Igualada. In Berga, where they got tied with the monarchists in number of seats. In the most important cities, the results were as follows:

Municipality	Seats	Republicans						Monarchists		
Municipality	Seats	ERC	PCR	PRR	PRDF	Other	Total	LR	Other	Total
Arenys de Mar	13		13				13			0
Badalona	32	9			8		17	15		15
Balaguer	13					9	9		4	4
Barcelona	50	25		12		1	38	12		12
Berga	14		7				7	7		7
Cervera	10	4	2				6	2	2	4
El Vendrell	12	7					7		5	5
Falset	11					7	7	1	3	4
Figueres	20	12			6	1	19	1		1
Gandesa	11					7	7	4		4
Girona	23	11	4				15	5	3	8
Granollers	18		13				13		5	5
Igualada	18					8	8		10	10
La Bisbal d'Empordà	12	2	1		5		8		4	4
La Seu d'Urgell	11		7				7		4	4
Les Borges Blanques	12			8			8		4	4
L'Hospitalet de Llobregat	26	8		1	2	4	15	11		11
Lleida	30	16		5		1	22	8		8
Manresa	27		9	1		7	17	7	3	10
Mataró	26	6	6			5	17		9	9
Montblanc	12	8					8	4		4
Olot	18					11	11	1	6	7
Puigcerdà	10					7	7	3		3
Reus	29	11	5			5	21	8		8
Sabadell	33	3	1	5	13		22	11		11
Sant Feliu de Llobregat	13	9				4	13			0
Santa Coloma de Farners	12		8				8	3	1	4
Solsona	11					7	7	4		4
Tarragona	28	7	10			2	19	2	7	9
Terrassa	31	8	5			8	21	1	9	10
Tortosa	30					20	20	2	8	10
Tremp	10		7			1	8		2	2
Valls	12	8	2				10		2	2
Vic	19		9			2	11	7	1	8
Vilafranca del Penedès	21	3	4	12		1	20	1		1
Vilanova i la Geltrú	21	15					15	6		6

=== Basque Country ===
Municipality	Seats	Socialist-Republican Conjunction					Monarchists				Others			
Municipality	Seats	PSOE	Rep	ANV	Other	Total	Mon	CT	Other	Total	PNV	PCE	Others	Total
Abanto y Ciérvana	17	7	4		1 (Note: Independent)	12						4	1 (Note: Independent)	5
Bermeo	19				5 (Note: Anti-Monarchist Bloc)	5					14			14
Bilbao [es]	47	10	11	7		28	3			3	14		2 (Note: Unknown affiliation)	16
Eibar	19	10	8			18					1			1
Erandio	18	3	1	1	4 (Note: Anti-Monarchist Bloc)	9					8		1 (Note: Independent)	9
Irun	20	1	12 (Note: Of which, 9 Radical Socialist Republican Party)			13	7			7				
Güecho	21		2			2	2			2	15		2 (Note: 1 Independent and 1 Unknown affiliation)	17
Portugalete	18				12 (Note: Anti-Monarchists)	12			6 (Note: Right-wing)	6				
San Sebastián	37		24 (Note: Radical Socialist Republican Party)			24			8 (Note: Monarchist-Regionalist)	8	5			5
Sestao	22	7	3	2	3 (Note: Left Bloc)	15	4		3 (Note: Right-wing)	7				
Tolosa	18				2 (Note: Anti-Monarchists)	2		3		3	3		10 (Note: Unknown affiliation)	13
Vergara	17							4		4	13			13
Vitoria	30	3	13 (Note: By party: 5 PRRS, 4 AR, 2 PRR, 1 PRDF and 1 Autonomous Republican Party of Álava)			16		4	2 (Note: 2 Catholic independents and 1 Catholic)	6	3		5 (Note: 3 Autonomists and 2 from the "Commercial Defence")	8
Sources: For Biskay: , For Guipuzkoa: For Álava:

== Aftermath ==
On 14 April, two days after the election, in the cities where the republicans won the election large crowds of people celebrated the victory on the streets. In Barcelona, Eibar, Madrid, Valencia, and other cities the Second Spanish Republic was proclaimed. Eibar was the first city to fly the Spanish tricolor. Alfonso XIII left Spain and exiled to Rome, without formally abdicating. A provisional government was formed and two months later a general election was called.

== See also ==
- 1931 Spanish general election
- Dictablanda of Dámaso Berenguer
