= Álvaro de Albornoz =

Spanish politician (1879–1954)

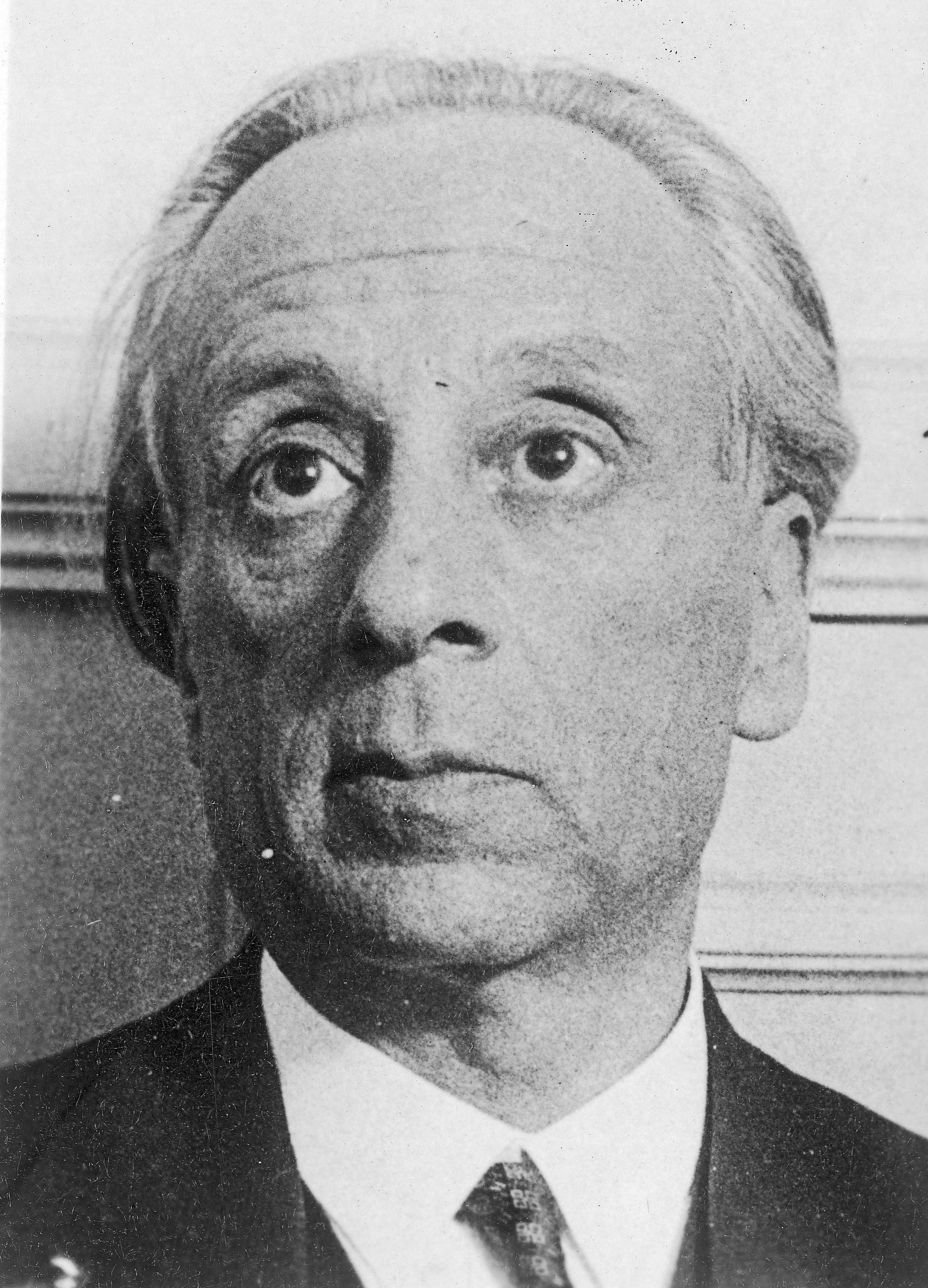
Álvaro de Albornoz

Álvaro de Albornoz y Liminiana (June 13, 1879, Asturias – October 22, 1954, Mexico) was a Spanish lawyer, writer, and one of the founders of the Second Republic of Spain.

== Early life ==
He began his early studies in his native town of Luarca, then he went to the University of Oviedo to study law. During his university years he experienced the excitement of the Republican Party in Oviedo which was very common in the intellectual circles at that time. Some of his professors were Leopoldo Alas "Clarín" and Adolfo Álvarez Buylla, a knowledgeable Marxist and founder of the Sociology Seminary at the Faculty’s Library. After Oviedo, Albornoz continued to Madrid where he was influenced by Francisco Giner de los Ríos and the "Institución Libre de Enseñanza." Throughout these years, his social and political beliefs were shaped and reinforced.

He then returned to Luarca, where in 1899 he and Amalia Salas were married. April 29, 1900, in Luarca, the couple's first child, Maria de la Concepción ("Concha") was born. The next year came "Alvarito," their son. Albornoz practiced law for ten years. He became more active with socialist activities and wrote for the "La Aurora Social," a political newspaper in Asturias. In 1909, he became a member of Lerroux’s Radical Republican Party. He was elected to the Spanish parliament in 1910. Following the 1914 elections, Albornoz left politics and the Radical Republican Party to practice law and spend more time writing.

== Political Career and the Second Spanish Republic ==
In 1929, when in the "Cárcel Modelo of Madrid" Albornoz would found, along with Marcelino Domingo, the new Radical Socialist Republican Party.

In 1930, after the "Pact of San Sebastian," Albornoz was arrested, imprisoned, and court martialed for Treason by the Supreme Court of War and Navy. His assigned defense attorney was Victoria Kent, the first woman to pass the Spanish bar. Albornoz was acquitted of all charges.

Albornoz was a member of the elected Spanish Second Republic, and, after the king fled Spain, a member of the Provisional Revolutionary Committee of 1930, and chairman of the constitutional draft committee," As the first president of the "Tribunal de Garantías Constitucionales," he eventually assumed responsibility for some of the reforms authorized by the new progressive constitution—–included the dissolution of the Jesuit Fraternal order, secular divorce, suppression of the State budget for the "cult and cleric," and other provisions relating to the installation of a secular government. He also served as Minister of Justice and Minister of Public Works.

July 27, 1936, he was named the Spanish Second Republica's Ambassador to Paris. By September, he was replaced and faced with returning to a Spain inflamed by Civil War.

== Life in Exile ==
In 1939, Albornoz, Salas, and daughter Concha de Albornoz emigrated to Havana, Cuba; and finally to Mexico City. His son Alvarito, Alavarito's wife Maria Araceli, and their son later joined them.

In exile, Albornoz Alvaro continued his representation for the Spanish Second Republic and with the Mexico City community of Spanish exiles. He was a member of Spanish Republican Action. He also helped found the Ateneo Salmerón. He served on the committee of the Spanish Junta de Liberation, representing the Republican Left party, working closely with Indalecio Prieto. He continued to travel and advocate on behalf of the duly elected government of Spain. May 11, 1940, he was named President of the Republic of Spain in Exile (till June 27, 1945). He was also named Prime Minister from 1947 to 1951, two consecutive terms.

He corresponded with people in France and the United States. He attended a United Nations conference representing the Second Spanish Republic government. But Franco—supported by the Church and Industry—was ensconced and Albornoz's work on behalf of the duly elected government came to no avail.

Albornoz died October 22, 1954, in Mexico City.

== Family ==
Albornoz's nephew (son of his sister) was Severo Ochoa the winner of the 1959 Nobel Prize in Physiology or Medicine with Arthur Kornberg.

He was also the grand-uncle and god-father of Aurora de Albornoz, celebrated poet and literary critic.

== Works ==
- La Instrucción, el ahorro y la moralidad de las clases trabajadoras (1900)
- No liras, lanzas (1903)
- Individualismo y socialismo (1908)
- Ideario radical (1913)
- El partido republicano (1918)
- El temperamento español, la democracia y la libertad (1921)
- La tragedia del estado español (1925)
- La Democracia (1925)
- Intelectuales y hombres de acción (1927)
- La Libertad (1927)
- El gran collar de la justicia (1930)
- El gobierno de los caudillos militares (1930)
- La política religiosa de la República (1935)
- Al servicio de la República. De la Unión Republicana al Frente Popular. Criterios de Gobierno (1936)
- Páginas del destierro (1941).
- Semblanzas españolas (1954)
