= Ateneu Enciclopèdic Popular =

Organization in Barcelona

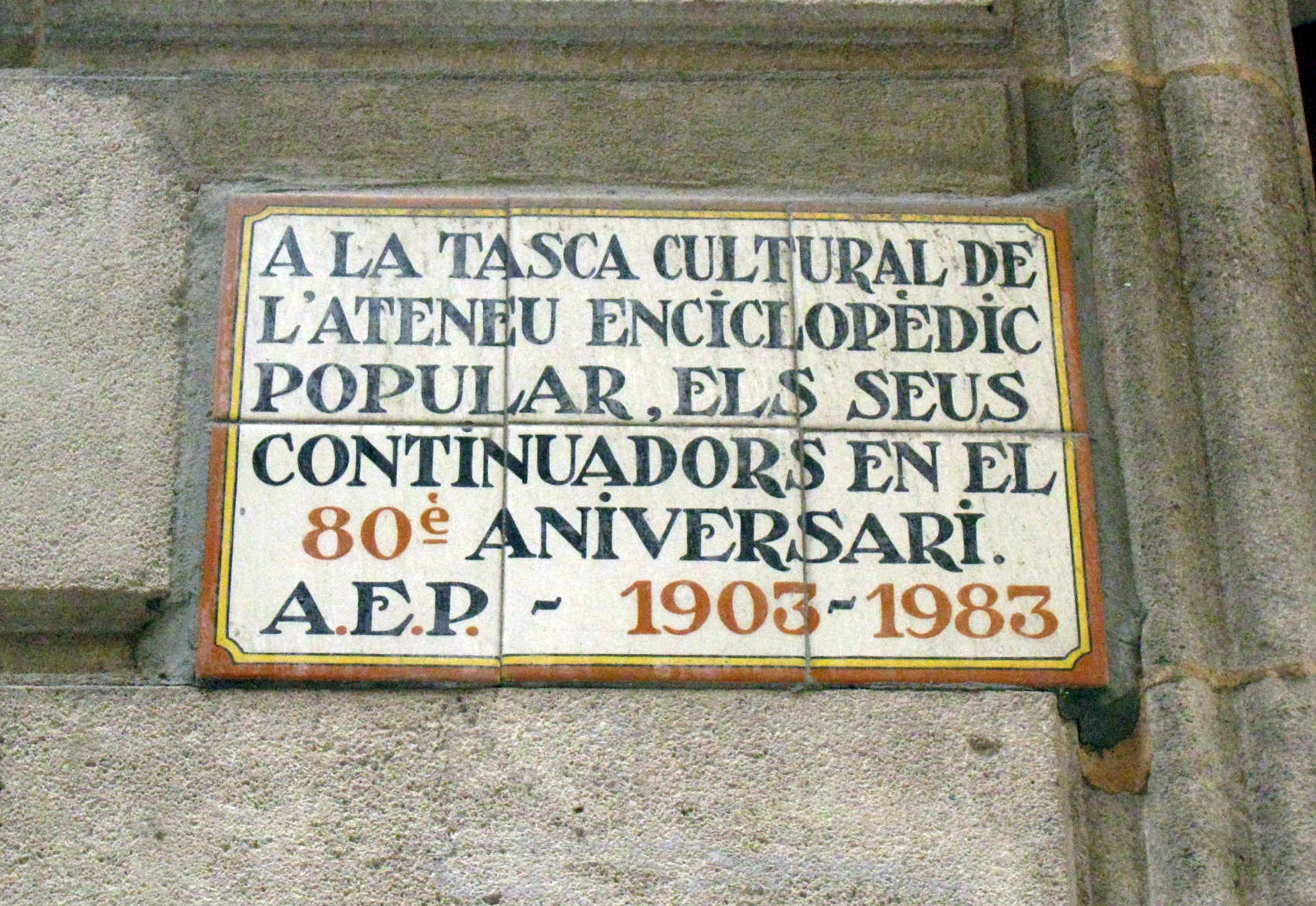
- Commemorative plate for the 80 years of Ateneu, in Carrer del Carme, El Raval, Barcelona, where Ateneu was hosted from 1906 to 1939.
- Formation: 1902 (unofficial formation)
- Established: 1903 (legally established)

The Popular Encyclopedic Ateneu [AEP] (en catalán Ateneu Enciclopèdic Popular- Centre de Documentació Històrica i Social) is a civic cultural association founded in Barcelona, Spain, in the year 1902 by a group of intellectuals and workers seeking a culturally neutral society as a means of emancipation, without any kind of political or ideological affiliation. Closed down by Francoist troops in January 1939 while the city was under occupation, it was made legal again in 1980.

Currently it is a documentation centre which, together with various other ateneus (in english atheneum) and cultural centers in the region of Catalonia, forms part of the Catalan Federation of Ateneus. Furthermore, it is affiliated with the Antonio Machado Foundation in Collioure, participates in the International Federation of Libertarian Studies and Documentation (FICELD), and houses the second largest archive of the global labor movement, after the IISG in Amsterdam.

== First stage: The AEP ==
The idea of founding the Popular Encyclopedic Athenaeum arose from a meeting between Josep Tubau, Eladi Gardó, and Francesc Layret, a philosophy and law student deeply involved with the social and cultural problems of the working class, at the University of Barcelona. Several meetings followed at the premises of Anselm Clavé's Choral Association, which were joined by various people with the same concerns and awareness of the repression following the failed general strike of 1902. These included the economist Pedro Corominas; the republican journalist Ignasi Bo; Eduard Marquina; Ernest Vendrell; the educator and politician of the republican-socialist coalition Luis de Zulueta; and the neo-Malthusian Luis Bulffi de Quintana, among others.[3]

The Popular Encyclopedic Athenaeum was inspired by the Ateneu Català de la Classe Obrera (in english the Catalan Ateneu of the Working Class) which was created in 1861. The Popular Encyclopedic Athenaeum was focused on worker orientation, campaigns against war and respect for civil jurisdiction, and the defense of human rights and the democratization of culture. It reached 25,000 members in this first stage, with several personalities actively participating, such as the poet Federico García Lorca [4]; Salvador Seguí; Joan Salvat-Papasseit in charge of the library section for a long time; Joaquim Maurín; Víctor Colomer; Manuel Ainaud Sánchez; Albert Bastardas; Jaume Aiguader; Josep Maria de Sucre; Joan Amades; Ángel Pestaña; and the illustrator and poster artist Carles Fontseré, who designed the entity's logo which depicts Francesc Layret, among many others.

== Years of Culture and Expansion: 1903–1923 ==
The activities of the Ateneu's members (which include organising courses and conferences) are divided into several sections. In a short time, the Ateneu became a leading institution, boasting a diverse number of sections.

=== The Ateneu Under the Dictatorship ===
During the years of Primo de Rivera's dictatorship, the "Practical Idealists" had their own space within the Ateneu. Its headquarters were located in a building on Carrer del Carme in Ciutat Vella, with a branch on a nearby street and even a villa in Sitjar de La Molina (Cerdanya), which was later seized by the Falange after the Spanish Civil War and is currently owned by the Generalitat of Catalonia.

== Second Republic: Pedagogy and Civics ==
The Ateneu ran a night school and organized various campaigns during the Second Republic (1931-1939), including one against working class unemployment; the Peace Front against War; support for the Roman mosaics of Tossa de Mar; and support of the People's Olympiad, among many others. It also housed a library. Several events were held to honor its two benefactors, Josep Campamà and Joaquim Arlunins, most notably the one on February 20, 1932, which was presided over by Francesc Macià (President of the Generalitat of Catalonia, who joined the Ateneu after the event [5]) and was accompanied by Jaume Aiguader (Mayor of Barcelona).[6] Its last activity before the fall of the Second Republic was the organization of a campaign promoting popular culture.

=== The Years of the Spanish Civil War ===
Most of the Ateneu's archives and extensive library were lost when its headquarters was burned down by Franco's occupying troops in January 1939, inspired by the rhetoric of General Mola, whose mission was to eradicate working-class culture. For this reason, the Ateneu's documents, buildings, and belongings were destroyed. Those items that survived were transferred to the Salamanca Archive, while part of the Ateneu's library was given to the holdings of the Library of the Central University of Barcelona.

== New Stage: Center for Historical-Social Documentation - Popular Encyclopedic Athenaeum ==
In 1977, the Center for Historical-Social Documentation was established [7] through the initiative and dynamism of a group of former members, almost exclusively of anarchist ideology. Among its founders were Tana Andrade, Abel Paz, Ernest Núñez, Cipriano Damiano, Carmen García, and Mari Cruz Carmona. Its founding charter is dated September 25, 1978, marking the starting point for the Ateneu's recovery. It was legally re-established on July 12, 1980, according to an official document from the Civil Government, with the same progressive, pluralistic, cultural, and popular spirit that characterized the previous stage.[8] The Ateneu, in this second era, carries out activities such as exhibitions, debates, conferences, cultural events, publications, and solidarity events.

The Historical and Social Documentation Center is one of the most comprehensive archives on the labor movement of the 19th and 20th centuries in Catalonia. It publishes the biannual bulletin Enciclopèdic Noticiari and participates in the editing and co-editing of books.

The institute is divided into the following sections:

- Literature and Poetry Section
- Library, Newspaper Archive, and Records Section. This is a resource for historians, archivists, and students, open to the general public for consultation of its collection. It houses a collection of approximately 38,000 books and 12,000 titles of newspapers, magazines, bulletins, and correspondence, as well as dossiers related to social and labor movements from the First International to the present day. Since 2007, there has been a campaign to recover its heritage seized during the Spanish Civil War, much of which is stored in the Archives of Salamanca.
- Contemporary History Section

In 2000, the AEP published the book A History of Barcelona. L’Ateneu Enciclopèdic Popular, 1902-1999, written by the historian and long-time president of the association, Ferran Aisa, for which he was awarded the City of Barcelona Prize:[9]

"... to Ferran Aisa, for the book *A History of Barcelona. Ateneu Enciclopèdic Popular (1902-1999)*, because he makes a remarkable contribution to the history of a leading institution of 20th-century Barcelonan popular culture." (translated from the original Catalan).

== Bibliography ==
- Aisa Pàmpols, Ferran (2000), Ateneu Enciclopèdic Popular (1902-1999). Una història de Barcelona, Barcelona: Lallevir SL/Virus editorial. ISBN 84-931045-0-7
- Huertas Claveria, Josep M. (1979), Obrers a Catalunya, Manual d'història (1840-1975), Barcelona: L'Avenç
- Gibson, Ian, (1987), Federico Garcia Lorca, Barcelona: Grijalbo
- Solà,Pere (1978). Els ateneus obrers i la cultura popular a Catalunya (1900-1939). L’Ateneu Enciclopèdic Popular. Barcelona: la Magrana
- Bosch i Datzira, Amàlia (1991). Els ateneus de Catalunya. Barcelona: Federació d’Ateneus de Catalunya
