= Rajendra Bhosale =

Rajendra Dhondu Bhosale is an Indian police officer, known for his efforts to rescue missing children in Mumbai, including a nine year long search for a missing child that resulted in tracing the child and reuniting the child with her family in 2022, well after his retirement.

Bhosale joined Police in 1978 as a constable. In 2011, he was assigned the charge of the missing bureau at Dadabhai Naoroji Nagar police station, where he pursued 340 separate cases of missing children (of 174 boys and 166 girls). Out of these, he traced 171 boy children and 165 girl children between 2011 and 2015. The remaining three boy children were also traced later, though not through his efforts. However, one child remained untraced, which troubled him even after his retirement in 2015. He continued his efforts, for a good seven years after his retirement, carrying the photo of the child wherever he went, till at last he traced and reunited the child with her family in 2022.
