= Murder of Phylicia Barnes =

Murder of American teenager

The murder of Phylicia Barnes is believed to have occurred in Baltimore, Maryland, United States, on December 28, 2010, in relation to a crime. Her body was recovered in the Susquehanna River on April 20, 2011, following a series of searches and national media coverage from various outlets, including The Today Show. The investigation into her death was ruled a homicide. About a year later, on April 25, 2012, her half-sister's ex-boyfriend, Michael Johnson, was arrested and charged with her murder. At the time, police declined to provide any details as to how the murder occurred, how they identified him as a suspect, or a motive in the case. Johnson was convicted on February 6, 2013, of second degree murder. However, the conviction was overturned when the trial judge granted the defense's motion for a new trial. Upon commencement of the second trial, all charges against Johnson were dropped on January 20, 2015.

Baltimore City Police considered the case the most vexing missing person case they had ever investigated. They labeled it as Baltimore's Natalee Holloway case.

== Victim ==
Phylicia Simone Barnes, born on January 12, 1994, and age 16 at the time of her disappearance, was an honor student from Monroe, North Carolina. She was on track to graduate early and had plans to attend Towson University. She was visiting her relatives in Baltimore when she disappeared.

== Disappearance ==
Barnes initially was believed to have disappeared while walking to the Reisterstown Road Plaza in Baltimore from a nearby apartment complex on December 28, the last day she was seen. Following her disappearance, she never used her cell phone or credit cards or updated her Facebook page.

On January 3, police stated they were 'enormously concerned' about the missing girl.

On January 22, America's Most Wanted aired a short feature during commercials.

=== Search ===
Three months after her disappearance came a renewed effort for prayers. A $36,000 reward was offered. Billboards were placed along major highways advertising for clues on her disappearance.

On April 9, 2011, Maryland State Police conducted a massive search of Patapsco Valley State Park using more than 100 members of law enforcement and volunteers. The search did not turn up Barnes's body, but another body with no ties to Barnes was found. Police declared themselves 'back at square one' after the search did not find her.

Friends and classmates of Barnes in Monroe held a carnival to raise money in her honor on April 9.

== Body found and homicide investigation ==
At 7:30 am on April 20, 2011, workers spotted a body floating in the Susquehanna River near the Conowingo Dam. Another body was later found nearby. Police confirmed the next day through a tattoo and dental records that the first body was that of Barnes. The body of the other victim, an adult male, was identified and deemed not connected to the case of Barnes.

Police at the time did not rule out foul play. They said the investigation into forensics and into determining how Barnes died and how she got to a location 45 miles from where she disappeared could take weeks.

On May 4, following an autopsy, the death was officially ruled a homicide. The cause of death was determined, but was withheld at that time for investigative purposes in fear of jeopardizing the investigation. Soon after, a security expert discussed the Barnes case.

On September 6, WSOCTV obtained court documents that showed Barnes's sister was attempting to obtain a restraining order against her former boyfriend Michael Johnson just two months following the disappearance. He was reportedly the last person to see Barnes alive. Johnson's attorney stated that Johnson was not responsible for the murder, and that he had a new girlfriend and had moved on. Johnson had been questioned eight times by police.

=== Suspect named ===
On April 25, 2012, Michael Johnson, the ex-boyfriend of Barnes' half sister, was arrested after fleeing from police, in connection with the disappearance and murder. At the time, police did not release details on the connection between Johnson and Barnes; only that Johnson was the last to see Barnes alive.

At a hearing on April 27 was the first time details of the murder became public. Assistant State's Attorney Lisa Goldberg asserted at a hearing that Johnson asphyxiated Barnes at her sister's apartment, and then carried her body out of the apartment in a 35-gallon plastic tub. He was reportedly seen sweating and struggling to move the container.

No motive for the murder was presented at the hearing. But it was reported that Johnson had just broken up with Barnes's sister. He was reported to have been using the tub that he was alleged to have carried out the body in to remove his belongings from her apartment. The tub has not been recovered.

It had been reported that during the visit, Johnson had made Barnes feel uncomfortable. He had exchanged 500 phone calls and text messages with Barnes and considered her his 'little sister.'.

=== Homicide count ===
On May 8, 2012, the city of Baltimore officially added Barnes to their 2010 homicide count. This increased the year's homicide total from 196 to 197. Considered to be nothing more than an administrative move, it still did not push the total count to 200. 2010 had been the first year since the 1970s in which the city of Baltimore recorded fewer than 200 homicides.

== Final plans ==
On April 28, more than 700 people gathered at the school Barnes used to attend to remember her.

Her funeral, which was private, took place in Georgia on May 7, 2011.

== Trial ==
On February 6, 2013, Johnson was acquitted of first-degree murder but convicted of second-degree murder.

During the trial, Barnes's sister and Johnson's former girlfriend Deena testified that Johnson had allowed Phylicia to consume alcohol and then made sexual advances on her. A neighbor testified that he had seen Johnson carrying a container out of the apartment, the one Barnes was believed to have been transported in. A petty criminal testified that he had helped Johnson dispose of the body.

The defense argued that no physical evidence proved that Johnson was the killer. The defense stated that the case was entirely circumstantial, and that Johnson did not have time to kill Barnes, clean the apartment of forensic evidence, and dispose of the body within the timeframe given, and altogether, he had no motive to commit the crime.

Sentencing was scheduled for March 20. Johnson could have received up to 30 years in prison.

Johnson's attorneys sought a new trial, alleging that the prosecution bolstered the credibility of the petty criminal who testified on their behalf.

At Michael Johnson's sentencing hearing on March 20, the judge threw out the murder conviction and ordered that he receive a new trial.

Johnson's new trial was originally set for February 21, 2014, but was postponed until April 28, 2014 at the request of his new attorneys.

On January 20, 2015, Judge John Addison Howard dropped all charges against Michael Johnson, stating there was insufficient evidence to continue the trial.

On March 30, 2018, after a third trial, Johnson was acquitted of all charges related to the murder of Phylicia Barnes.

== Long-term impact on society ==
The Barnes case has resulted in increased advocacy for the missing.

=== One year later ===
On the one-year anniversary of Barnes's disappearance, a vigil was held by family and friends in her memory at the believed site of her disappearance. Her father stated he did not believe she was murdered after having gone out and that whatever took place was in the apartment. Police said they are closer to solving the case but did not want to divulge details in order to avoid jeopardizing the investigation.

Barnes' half-brother Bryan joined the Baltimore Police Department in 2012, inspired by the work detectives did.

=== Phylicia's Law ===
In 2012, a bill known as Phylicia's Law passed in the Maryland General Assembly, named after Barnes. The bill, sponsored by Maryland State Delegate Jill P. Carter, leg. dist. 41., requires the state to publish a list of missing children along with statistics, and a list of volunteers who can aid law enforcement in the search for missing children. While similar laws exist in other states, this became the first such law named after a minority-race child.

The bill was signed into law by Governor Martin O'Malley on May 1, 2012.

=== Phylicia Barnes Foundation ===
A foundation was started in Barnes' memory. Fundraising was done at an area Chick-Fil-A.

== See also ==
- List of unsolved murders (2000–present)
