= A Child is Missing Alert =

Company in Florida

A Child Is Missing Alert (ACIM) is a non-profit organization located in Fort Lauderdale, Florida, United States, which assists law enforcement in the early search and recovery of missing children (often autistic or with Down syndrome), elderly (often with Alzheimer's/dementia), disabled persons and college students with the goal of doing so within the first few hours. The program sends alert calls to the area the person was last seen and calls to land lines and cellphones, Twitter, websites and does expanded calling when asked for by law enforcement nationwide. Since 1997 there have been over 45,000 cases reported. The program is available to law enforcement 24/7, 365 days a year, nationwide. ACIM also offers a program to allows local law enforcement to notify a neighborhood when a sexual predator has moved into their area.

A Vidal Child Safety Education Program (CSEP) began in 2005. It is a local program taught by specially trained, register schoolteachers in Miami/Dade, Broward, Palm Beach, Manatee, Sarasota and other Florida areas. The High Risk Youth program - The Anatomy of a Murder of a Bully and "Express Yourself!" have been used with the High Risk Youth that are court appointed to be in the classes.

The program is supported by donations from individuals and law enforcement. ACIM was founded by Sherry Friedlander-Olsen who serves as the Executive Director. Member of CMACO, helped to form the Human Trafficking Collection in Fort Lauderdale, Broward Chiefs Association and other vital programs.

In 2019, ACIM received a failing score of 70 out of 100 from Charity Navigator, as 62.93% of the organization's expenses went toward its program operations. According to Charity Navigator, the CEO received a yearly salary of $95,726 in 2011, $94,419 in 2010, and $94,320 in 2009
