= Carrer de Joaquín Costa, Barcelona =

Street in Barcelona

Coordinates: 41.3824°N 2.1659°E

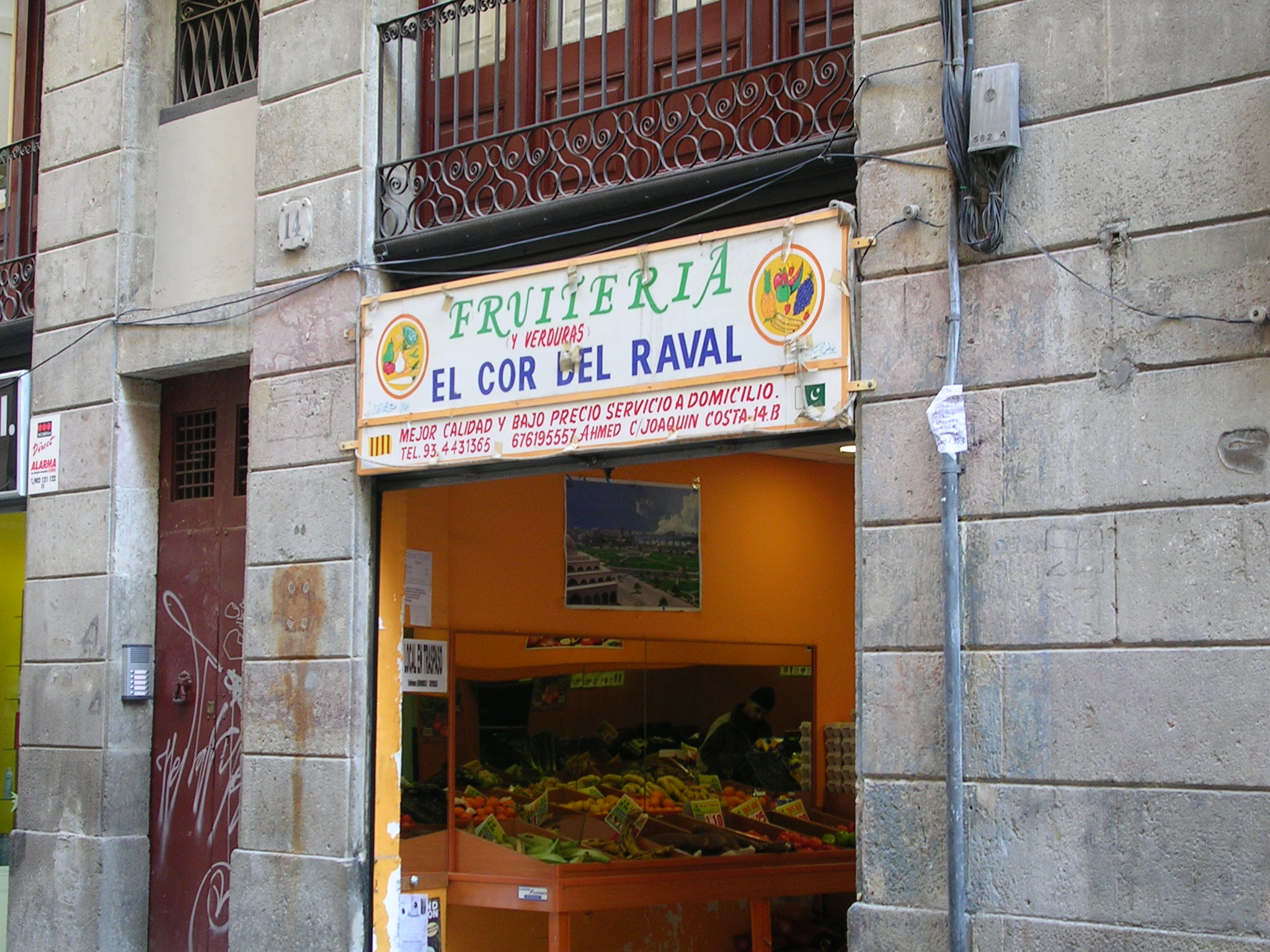
A small, Pakistani-owned fruit shop in Carrer de Joaquín Costa.

Carrer de Joaquín Costa is a street in the city centre of Barcelona (Catalonia, Spain). It belongs to the neighbourhood of Raval, beginning at Plaça de Goya by Ronda de Sant Antoni and finally converging into Carrer del Carme. The area surrounding it is a well-known nightlife district, and many bars. From working class beginnings, the street has been in a continuous state of gentrification during the 2000s (decade) and has become more mainstream attention in recent years, as well as a residential area home to many Filipino and Pakistani immigrants. Teatre Goya and the Aragonese Cultural Centre are on the northern end of Joaquín Costa.

== Names and history ==
The street is named after the 19th century Aragonese intellectual, economist and Liberal politician Joaquín Costa. Until 1923, the street's former name was Calle Poniente (Spanish or Carrer Ponent (Catalan). An early 20th-century serial killer, Enriqueta Martí, known as "the vampire of Barcelona" or "the vampire of calle Poniente" lived on number 29 of this street.

== Transport ==
Although no buses run It can be easily accessed from the Barcelona Metro stations Universitat (L1 and L2 and Sant Antoni).
