= Enriqueta Martí =

Spanish serial killer (1868–1913)

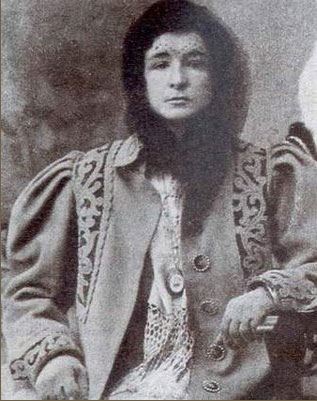
- Born: Enriqueta Martí i Ripoll; February 2, 1871; Sant Feliu de Llobregat, Kingdom of Spain
- Died: 12 May 1913 (aged 42); Barcelona, Kingdom of Spain
- Resting place: Montjuïc Cemetery; 41.353889°N 2.155556°E
- Occupations: Maid, babysitter and prostitute
- Years active: 1900-1912 (confirmed)
- Spouse: Juan Pujaló
- Criminal charges: Serial killer, kidnapper and procuress

Details
- Victims: 12 (confirmed and known)

Enriqueta Martí Ripoll (2 Feb 1871 – 12 May 1913) was a Spanish child serial killer, kidnapper, prostitute and procuress of children. She was called "The Vampiress of carrer Ponent", "The Vampiress of Barcelona" and "The Vampiress of the Raval" in the press.

Some researchers have, however, asserted that she was not a killer of children, but rather a person with mental disorders who can only be proven reliably to have abducted one young girl, Teresita Guitart. They also contend that the acts that are attributed to her could not be proven.

== Early life ==
Enriqueta Martí was born in Sant Feliu de Llobregat in 1871. As a young woman, Martí moved from her hometown to Barcelona where she worked as a maidservant and nanny; she soon turned to prostitution, and worked in a high-class brothel. In 1895 she married a painter named Juan Pujaló, but the marriage failed. According to Pujaló, Martí's affairs with other men, her unpredictable character, and her continuous visits to houses of "ill repute" caused the separation. The pair reconciled and separated approximately six times. At the time of Martí's detention in 1912, the couple had been separated for five years, and had no children.

== Biography ==
In 1909 Martí opened her own brothel, which attracted some of the more affluent people in Barcelona. Some of them had unusual desires which she accommodated for a premium. Some expressed a desire for children. To accommodate them, she dressed as a pauper during the day and frequented the poorer parts of the city. When she came across unaccompanied children she abducted them to prostitute them in her brothel. She begged and joined bread queues at the monasteries to find the most abandoned-looking children. By night she attended the El Liceu, the Casino de la Arrabassada, and other places where the wealthy of Barcelona gathered, likely offering her services as a procurer of children.

At the same time as she was prostituting children, Martí was also practising as a witch-doctor. She claimed drinking the blood of children could cure tuberculosis, and offered creams and elixirs that could stop ageing and prolong life. The ingredients she used to make her remedies came from the remains of the children that she was killing, who ranged from 5 up to 15 years of age. She used the fat, blood, hair, and bones. For this reason, she did not have problems disposing of her victims. Martí offered salves, ointments, philtres, poultices, and potions, especially to treat tuberculosis, which was highly feared at the time, and various other incurable diseases. The wealthy paid large sums of money for these remedies.

During the Tragic Week of 1909, Martí was arrested at her flat on Barcelona's carrer Minerva, along with a young man from a wealthy family, and accused of running a brothel that offered sexual services from children. Thanks to her contacts with Barcelona's high society using her services, she was never tried.

Over the next three years many more children disappeared, but as they were from poor families police investigations into their disappearance were minimal.

It is suspected that Martí kidnapped a large number of children over a span of twenty years. She was finally arrested in a flat in El Raval; more evidence was found in flats in Barcelona where she had lived previously.

Forensic experts managed to differentiate a total of twelve children with what little evidence they were able to recover. In spite of suspicions, and because Martí did not tally her activities, experts are unsure if she was Spain's deadliest killer. It is clear that she acted for many years in Barcelona. The public suspected that someone was kidnapping babies, and many children disappeared without a trace causing dread among the population.

=== 29 carrer Ponent ===
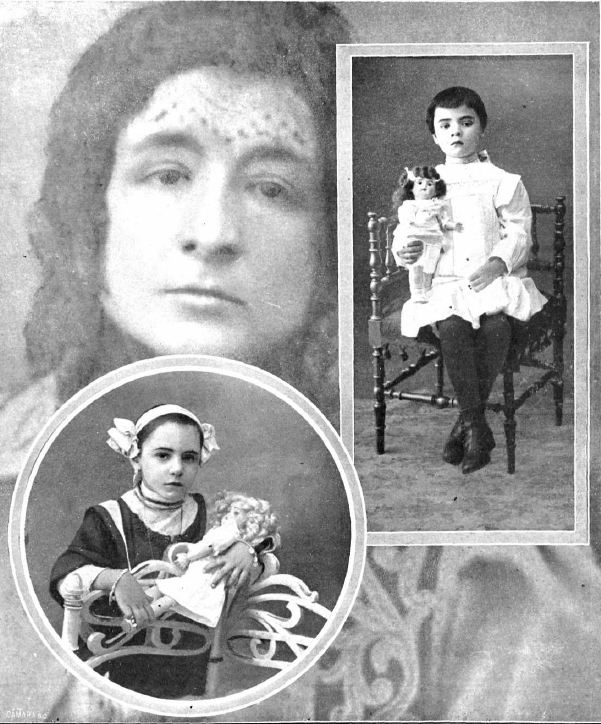
Photographs by Antonio Esplugas which show Enriqueta Martí and the two girls rescued by police, Teresita Guitart and Angelita

On 10 February 1912, Martí kidnapped her last victim: Teresita Guitart Congost. For two weeks the city looked for her and there was great public indignation since the authorities had been extremely passive regarding the missing children. A suspicious neighbour, Claudia Elías, found Congost's trail. On 17 February, Elías saw a girl with cropped hair looking from a casement window of a first floor flat at number 29 carrer Ponent (now Carrer de Joaquin Costa). Elías had never seen the girl. She asked her neighbor if the girl was hers but the neighbor, who was Martí, closed the window without saying a word. Elías shared this, as well as her suspicions that the little girl was Congost, with a mattress-maker down the street. She also told him of the strange life that her neighbour was leading. The mattress-maker informed a municipal agent, Jose Asens, of Elías' suspicions and he, in turn, communicated this to the chief of the Ribot brigade.

On 27 February, saying there had been a complaint about chickens in the flat, two Ribot agents went to look for Martí. They found her in the court of calle de Ferlandina, informed her of the accusation, then escorted her to her flat. She proved to be surprised but did not object. When the policemen entered, two girls were found in the flat. One of them was Teresita Guitard Congost, the other a girl called Angelita. After making a statement, Congost was returned to her parents. She explained how Martí took her by the hand promising her candies, covered her with a black rag, and forced her to the flat. Martí cut Congost's hair and changed her name to Felicidad, telling the child she no longer had parents and was to call her "mama" from then on. Martí fed the girl potatoes and stale bread and preferred to pinch rather than beat the child. She was prohibited from going to the windows and balconies as well as several rooms in the flat.

Congost told authorities that Martí was in the habit of leaving them alone and that one day they risked exploring the rooms that Martí forbade them from entering. They had found a sack with a girl's clothes and a boning knife, all covered in blood. Congost never left the flat during her captivity.

Angelita's declaration was more frightening. Before Congost arrived at the flat, there was a five-year-old boy called Pepito. Angelita said that she secretly saw Martí, who she was calling "mom", kill him on the kitchen table. Angelita's identity was more difficult to pinpoint as she did not know her real surname but confirmed Martí's claim that her father was called Juan. Martí maintained that Angelita was her daughter by her estranged husband Juan Pujaló. He appeared before a judge and declared that he had not lived with Martí for years, that they had not had children, and that he did not know where Angelita came from. Eventually, Martí claimed that she had taken the girl as a newborn from her sister-in-law having told her that the girl was stillborn. Enriqueta Martí Ripollés was detained and jailed in the Reina Amalia prison.

During the second inspection of the flat, detectives found the sack with the bloody clothing and the knife. They also found another sack with dirty clothes and at least thirty small human bones. These bones showed evidence of being exposed to fire. Investigators found a lounge sumptuously decorated with a cupboard with nice clothes for a boy and girl. This lounge contrasted with the rest of the flat which was austere and smelled bad. In another locked room they found the horror that Martí was hiding. In it, there were fifty pitchers, jars, and washbowls, with preserved human remains: greasy lard, coagulated blood, children's hair, skeletonized hands, powdered bones, and pots with the potions, ointments, and salves already prepared for sale.

Investigators also went to two more flats where Martí had lived: a flat in the carrer Tallers, a third in carrer Picalqués, and a little house in carrer Jocs Florals, in Sants. In both of them, they found false walls and human remains in the walls and ceilings. In the garden of the house on carrer Jocs Florals, they found the skull of a three-year-old child, and a series of bones that corresponded to 3, 6 and 8-year-old children. Some remains still had pieces of clothes whose condition indicated that Martí had habitually kidnapped children of impoverished families with insufficient means to look for their missing children. Further investigation revealed more housing in Sant Feliu de Llobregat, the property of Martí's family. Here they found remains of children in vases and jars as well as books of remedies.

Martí's flat contained many miscellaneous curios: an ancient book with parchment covers, a book of notes where she had written recipes and potions in elegant calligraphy, a package of letters and notes written in coded language, and a list with names of families and important figures in Barcelona. The list was very controversial since the public believed that it was a list of Enriqueta's rich clients and that, because of their wealth, they would not pay for their crimes of paedophilia or of buying human remains to treat their health. Police tried to stop the list from leaking, but rumours abounded that it was a client list of doctors, politicians, businessmen and bankers. With events of the Tragic Week in their minds, and fearing riots, authorities calmed the public with newspaper articles explaining that the list contained the names of people that Martí had begged from, and that they had been swindled by the lies and requests of the murderer.

Martí was imprisoned in the Reina Amàlia jail [es] in Barcelona to await trial. She tried to commit suicide by slashing her wrists with a wooden knife. Public indignation exploded because the people wanted her to face trial and execution by the garrote. Prison authorities made it known in the press that measures had been taken to ensure that Martí would not be able to kill herself.

Martí was never tried for her crimes. She was killed by lynching at the hands of her fellow prison inmates on one of the prison patios on 12 May 1913, a year and three months after her arrest. Some believe the inmates were paid by Marti's wealthy clients so the details of her crimes were not revealed in a public trial. However, her death certificate gave uterine cancer as her cause of death. The untimely death robbed authorities of the opportunity to completely expose all of her secrets. She was buried secretly in a common grave in the Cementerio del Sudoeste, situated on the mountain of Montjuïc in Barcelona.

=== Declarations and testimonies ===
Martí was interrogated about the presence of Teresita Guitart in her house and explained that she had found the girl, lost and hungry, the day before in the Ronda de Sant Pau. Claudia Elías denied this because she had seen the girl in her flat several days before the arrest.

Martí was also questioned about the presence of bones, human remains, creams, potions, poultices, ointments, blood bottles, as well as the boning knife. Interrogators asked if she had subjected the bones to be burned or cooked, as forensics suggested. Martí claimed that she studied human anatomy, but under pressure from the interrogators she confessed that she was a healer and used children as raw material for the production of her remedies. She claimed to be an expert, and knew how to make the best remedies and preparations that were highly sought after by wealthy people of good social position.

During interrogation, she disclosed the locations of her other flats (carrer Tallers, carrer Picalqués, Jocs Florals and her home in Sant Feliu de Llobregat), and told investigators where to look inside them. She was already known for, and confessed to, her services as a procurer for paedophiles, but out of anger at the fate that awaited her, did not name a single customer.

Investigators knew of the existence of the little boy known as "Pepito" from the testimony of Angelita and Claudia Elias. Martí claimed Pepito had been entrusted to her by a family that could not care for him. When asked about his whereabouts, she said that he had gone to the country because he had become ill, the same excuse she had used with her inquiring neighbor, Claudia Elías. Overwhelming evidence and Angelita's testimony shattered this excuse. She was unable to refute bloody clothes in a sack, the knife, and some remnants of fresh fat, blood, and bones. These remains were those of Pepito. Nor could she identify the family that had entrusted her with the child, making it clear that the boy was another kidnapped child.

An Aragonese woman from Alcañiz recognized her as the kidnapper of her infant son, some six years earlier, in 1906. Martí displayed an extraordinary kindness to the exhausted and hungry woman after a very long journey from their land and was allowed to hold the child. Using an excuse, she moved away from the mother then disappeared. The unfortunate mother never found her son nor came to know what she did with him. It is suspected that she used the baby to manufacture her remedies.

Martí confessed that she had prostituted a girl of seventeen years in a brothel on carrer Sabadell, and had also performed abortions, but she never confessed to killing anyone.

=== Counter theories ===
For his book Barcelona 1912 (published in 2014), Barcelona writer Jordi Corominas conducted an exhaustive investigation into the life of Enriqueta Martí. Reviewing the journalistic chronicles that were published at the time, he warned that many articles were based on the rough information that was available in the first days, but there were no subsequent investigative follow-ups. In the opinion of Corominas, Martí was in fact a woman devastated by the death of a child, barely ten months old, from malnutrition. In the words of Corominas: "Distressed by that situation, she kidnapped Tereseta." Maybe to find a company for Angeleta, the other girl she cared for, in the flat she shared with her grandfather. She did not have an analytical or criminal mind. Today, she would have received psychiatric care."

The facet of Enriqueta Martí as a serial killer would be, for Corominas, part of an unfounded black legend to cover cases of sexual scandals involving minors by the upper classes of society and the kidnapping of children for the cure of conditions afflicting the upper classes of the time. in his words: "Enriqueta was not a murderer but rather a paradigm of a poor and desperate Barcelona that was not the one that used to go out in the media ... Many of those who came back to explain the case just read the reviews of those first days, but they stopped investigating the last traces of the story." In his book, Corominas explains that the remains of blood found in her house belonged to Enriqueta, who suffered from uterine cancer resulting in vaginal haemorrhages. On the other hand, the skeletal remains found were not shown to be of recently murdered children, according to Corominas they were probably extracted from some cemetery and used as magical amulets, and others were animals used for cooking, chicken and pork bones. He also considers that the existence of the "ointments" with which Enriqueta sold as medicinal remedies was not proof.

Historian Elsa Plaza spent seven years studying the case of Enriqueta Martí and has written a book, El Cielo Bajo Los Pies (The Sky Underfoot), which brings to light information about the woman herself. Plaza explains that since 1912 Barcelona has referred to Martí as a serial killer though: "Enriqueta was never formally charged with murder nor was any corpse of a child found in her home." She often went begging with other women's children because there was a network of women who helped each other. It was eventually shown that Angelita was truly her niece by her estranged husband's sister, María Pujaló. Martí's story has generally been told by men. Nobody thought that blood found in her flat could belong to Martí herself; she was shown to be dying of uterine cancer and often bled heavily. Most newspapers at the time claimed Martí was the woman who had kidnapped about 40 children from the Fifth District. When the bones found in one of Martí's houses (in carrer Picalquers) were determined to be from multiple animals instead of from children, the assembled journalists almost attacked the doctor who made the announcement. Martí's case was fodder for nascent tabloid journalism; she became the ideal scapegoat to blame for the missing children.

Shortly before Martí's arrest, police had closed a brothel in carrer Botella that prostituted children. The fine for raping a boy or a girl was fifty pesetas; a worker earned four pesetas a day. The owner was apprehended, but not the customers. In addition, Barcelona was a major producer and exporter of pornography, exporting films and pictures to the rest of Europe and to the Americas.

Plaza explains that the entire trial was staged: "They wanted to cover the misery and exploitation. The point of all was the discovery of a child brothel in carrer Botella. It is true that children disappeared. Some were sent to France, where they were exploited in glass factories outside Paris", she explains. The stolen (or sold by their parents to ease economic hardship) children were useful for: begging, illegal adoptions, child abuse, or exploitation in factories where the hard work was crippling. "We can suspect that some girls were victims of international trafficking for prostitution. Here there are not many papers on the subject, but there are in Latin America. Girls were sent to New York, Buenos Aires and Rio de Janeiro. In 1903, the board against white slavery was created and chaired by the Infanta Isabel," Plaza notes. When Enriqueta Martí died at dawn May 13, 1913, she was attended by two inmates who asked if they could attend to the body.

== Works about Enriqueta Martí ==
=== Literature ===
- Los diarios de Enriqueta Martí by Pierrot is a novel that centres on a few supposed diaries that Enriqueta Martí wrote before beginning her murderous career. Illustrated by the author.
- El misterio de la calle Poniente is a novel by Fernando Gómez. In February 1912 the disappearance of a three-year-old girl shocked Barcelona. The investigation and, later discoveries, revealed to the public a series of macabre murders that shook a city that was recovering from the Tragic Week. The book details many prominent figures who helped to shape the story; individuals of flesh and blood, many of them incapable of being the protagonists of their own story. They converge to outline faithfully the authentic face of the merciless Enriqueta Martí, who begs by day, dresses as a marquise by night, and knows the power from the darkest side. The fresh blood is her valued goods, the children her suppliers, and a sick middle-class her clients.
- El Cielo Bajo los Pies is a non-fiction book by Elsa Plaza. In a case that shocked Barcelona in 1912. Enriqueta Martí, called by the derisive names "The Vampiress of Barcelona" and "The Bad Woman", was besieged by all kinds of rumours from the moment police arrested her, accusing her of making children disappear with the most aberrant intentions, from turning them into objects of pleasure for the wealthy to making cosmetics and salves to prolong life. Martí is presented as a likely scapegoat and a number of destitute families are accused of selling their children, albeit out of economic desperation.
- Barcelona Shadows, a novel by Marc Pastor. "Pastor’s humble but effective storytelling innovation is to have Death narrate the story… It sounds gimmicky, but in Pastor’s able hands (neatly translated by Mara Faye Lethem) it adds a fateful dimension… Pastor is also skilled at creating brief, crisp scenes that get into the minds not only of his detective but of two captive little girls, and other characters as well. He’s grittily insightful into the psychology of a city under stress… [a] dark, fast-moving tale." — Blogcritics
- La vampira del carrer ponent o els misteris de Barcelona by Josep Arias Velasco.

=== Theatre ===
- La Vampira del Raval (The Vampire of the Raval) a 2013 musical by Albert Guinovart won the Max Awards for the Performing Arts (Los Premios Max de las Artes Escénicas, Spanish) for his musical score of this piece.

=== Films ===
- In the Spanish film "Diamond Flash" (2011), directed by Carlos Vermut, the character of Enriqueta is inspired by Enriqueta Martí. In the film, Enriqueta controls an organization that is dedicated to the kidnapping of children.
- "The Barcelona Vampiress" or "La vampira de Barcelona" (2020), directed by Lluís Danés. In early 20th century Barcelona, little Teresa goes missing shocking the country. When police start investigating Enriqueta Martí, the "Vampiress of Raval", they cover a much more sinister affair.

=== Television ===
- In episodes 20 and 35 of the first season of Cuarto Milenio, broadcast in 2006, the theme of the so-called vampiresa was discussed.
- The figure was characterized in the Spanish TV series El ministerio del tiempo (episode Separadas por el tiempo played by Maria Rodriguez) as a former servant of one of the protagonists who was dismissed for theft and inadvertently discovers through time travel that she will become a serial killer who exploits children, and tries to avoid her destiny by escaping into other periods in history. Eventually, her younger self offers to not change history any more than she already has and agrees to become the woman history says she was on condition that she be allowed to die a more painless death than what was previously described in jail

== See also ==
- List of serial killers by country
- List of serial killers by number of victims

== Bibliography ==
- Parker, R. J.; Vronski, Peter; Newton, Michael; Ramsland, Katherine; Perrini, Sylvia; Banaski, Kelly (2014). 2015 Serial Killers True Crime Anthology, Volume II. Rj Parker Publishing, Inc. ISBN 9781500505165.
- Rauf, Don (2015). Female Serial Killers. Enslow Publishing, LLC. ISBN 9780766072886.
