= Milagros Caturla =

Spanish photographer (1920–2008)

Milagros Caturla (Barcelona, 1920 – Sant Cugat del Vallés 2008) was a Spanish amateur photographer. Her work is notable for capturing the everyday life of Barcelona in the late 1950s and 1960s.

== Biography ==
She was born in Barcelona in 1920. She was the seventh of nine children born to Luis Caturla, a lieutenant colonel in the Infantry, and Josefa Soriano. She grew up and came of age during the Second Spanish Republic. Before becoming a civil servant in the Diputación Provincial de Barcelona, she worked as a dressmaker in her own workshop in her parents' home and in a food company. She also worked as a seamstress in her parents' home.

Her love of photography led her to buy a Leica M2, the cheapest Leica at the time. In Valencia Street, Barcelona, set up her own home development laboratory. She bought the equipment out of her own wages. She was forced to give up photography when she had to move to a flat in the Ciutat Vella district, where she had no place to set up her photo lab. She died in San Cugat del Vallés on 28 March 2008.

== Member of the Agrupació Fotogràfica de Catalunya ==
She came into contact with aerial photography in her second post at the Diputación, in the surveying department. But she was interested in another form of photographic expression. On 26 October 1957 she joined the Agrupació Fotogràfica de Catalunya, with membership number 1,859. In the same year, Joan Colom also became a member. At that time, the reportage work of Francesc Català Roca and Xavier Miserachs in street photography stood out.

Two years later, Eugeni Forcano presented his first works at the association. But it was not as easy for women to stand out as it was for Forcano and Colom. Although the Association, founded in 1923, had tried to create a women's group from the outset, the reality was that two women, Mercè Vilamur and Paulina Macià, joined in 1924. But their project did not take off. It was not easy to be a woman in that context, according to Victoria Bonet, historian of the AFC. In an interview, Carmen García Pedrosa, one of the photographers, explained that they were insulted when they went out into the streets with their cameras, shouted at them to go home and wash the dishes.

== Discovery of her work ==
A photography enthusiast, Tom Sponheim, who was on holiday in Europe in 2001, bought some photographic negatives in Barcelona's old Encantes market one December morning. He was shocked to discover the contents of the nine envelopes he had paid €3.50 for when he returned to Seattle. "When I got home, I happened to develop a negative and there was a little girl in a school uniform standing behind the bench where two old ladies were talking. I was amazed at how wonderful the photograph was". The search for the author began from then on.

Begoña Fernández investigated the authorship of the photos and discovered that they belonged to Milagros Caturla, an anonymous civil servant who was then deceased. In her investigation, Begoña Fernández suspected that it was a woman, as many of the images had been taken in a school and only girls appeared in them, and it would have been strange for a man to have crossed that boundary of separation of the sexes at that time. The images were taken at the Carmen Tronchoni school, now Tres Pinos.

During the Franco era, in the 1950s and 1960s, there were few pastimes or hobbies that allowed people to express their creativity in photography. One exception was the so-called photographic salons. These were competitions for amateurs who tried to reproduce the style of the masters of the profession. As the Agrupació Fotogràfica de Catalunya collects all its bulletins and the prizes of the salons are classified, a prize from 1961 was found which corresponded to one of the negatives found in the Encants in 2001. It was entitled 'Fervor' and shows a woman praying with a rosary in her hand and a gesture of despair on her face.

Caturla's photographs won many prizes, sometimes in competitions for women only, but also in general competitions. In 1961 she came second to Eugeni Forcano in the Fiestas de Gracia photography prize.
