= Directorate for Investigating Organized Crime and Terrorism =

Romanian anti-crime and anti-terrorism agency

Directorate for Investigating Organized Crime and Terrorism Direcția de Investigare a Infracțiunilor de Criminalitate Organizată și Terorism
- English logo
- Abbreviation: DIICOT

Agency overview
- Formed: 2004

Jurisdictional structure
- National agency (Operations jurisdiction): Romania
- Operations jurisdiction: Romania
- Legal jurisdiction: As per operations jurisdiction

Operational structure
- Headquarters: Bucharest
- Parent agency: Prosecutor's Office of the High Court of Cassation and Justice

Website
- www.diicot.ro

The Directorate for Investigating Organized Crime and Terrorism (Romanian: Direcția de Investigare a Infracțiunilor de Criminalitate Organizată și Terorism, DIICOT) is a law enforcement agency of the Romanian government tasked with investigating and prosecuting organized crime, drug trafficking, cybercrime, financial crimes, and terrorism-related offenses. It was formed in 2004 under Law 508/2004, and operates under the jurisdiction of the Romanian Public Ministry.

The DIICOT is headed by a Chief Prosecutor and a deputy, nominated by the Minister of Justice and appointed by the President of Romania. The Chief Prosecutor of the Directorate is subordinated to the General Prosecutor of the Prosecutor's Office attached to the High Court of Cassation and Justice.

Considered to be smaller and lesser known than its sister agency, the National Anticorruption Directorate, the DIICOT has wider ranging responsibilities that include crimes against cultural heritage, tobacco smuggling, and migrant trafficking. In 2017 alone, over 3,200 people were convicted based on its investigations and indictments.

== History ==
After the resignation of former DIICOT chief prosecutor Giorgiana Hosu, the agency's top role was filled by her deputy, Oana Pâțu, in an acting position. On December 28, 2022, DIICOT announced that her permanent replacement will be selected by March 1, 2023.
Starting with April 13, 2023 the chief prosecutor role was filled by Alina Albu.

== See also ==
- Crime in Romania
- Kidnapping of Alexandra Măceșanu and Luiza Melencu
- Andrew Tate
