= Death of Juan Andrés Benítez =

Description of political death

- Date: October 6, 2013

The death of Juan Andrés Benítez took place on 6 October 2013 in the neighborhood of El Raval of Barcelona, after he had been violently detained by the Mozos d’Escuadra, the autonomous police of Catalonia.

== Juan Andrés Benítez ==
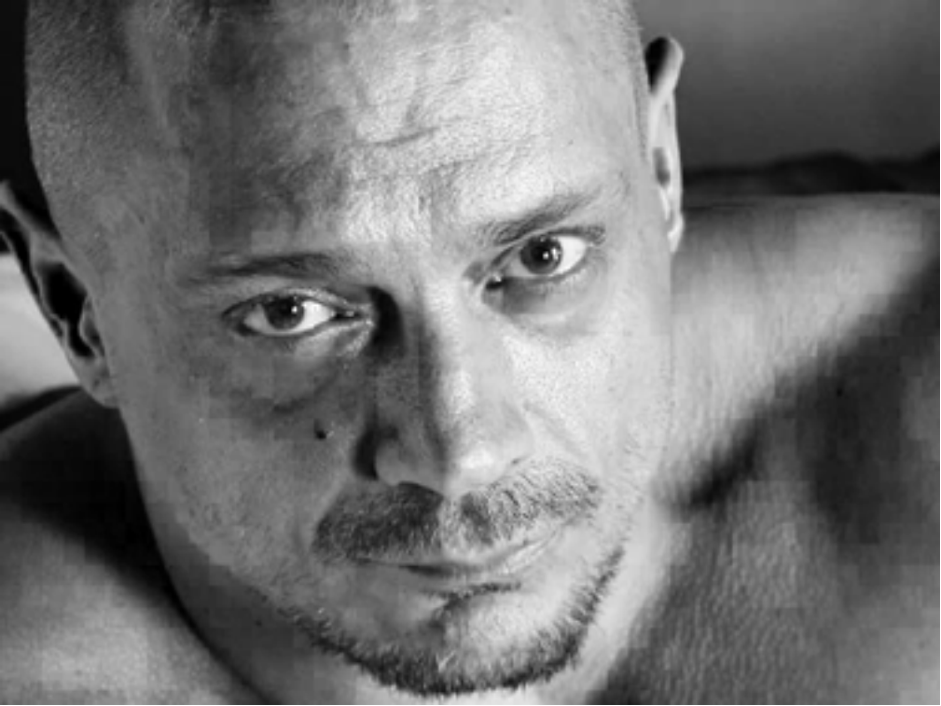
Portrait of Juan Andrés Benítez from the book Violencia y muerte de Juan Andrés Benítez en el Raval de Barcelona en 2013

Juan Andrés Benítez (Jerez de la Frontera, 7 April 1963 - Barcelona, 6 October 2013) was a businessman of the Barcelona neighborhood Eixample, and founding member of the Catalan Association of Companies for Gays and Lesbians. Born in Andalusia, he moved to Barcelona after having lived in several European cities. He worked for a year in a bar on Villarroel Street in the city and later opened several clothing stores, such as Mi Tropa and American Men.

== Death ==
Benítez died in the early morning of October 6, 2013 at the Hospital Clínic of Barcelona after having been repeatedly struck by officers of the Mossos d'Esquadra on Carrer de l'Aurora in the Raval neighborhood. Benítez had moved into an apartment he owned there only a few days prior to his death. During the police assault, Benítez suffered a cardiac arrest that was not related to drug use or any pre-existing heart condition (as had initially been suggested), but was instead caused by the officers' restraint techniques. The police themselves called an ambulance; paramedics tried to revive him and took him to the Hospital Clínic, where he died three hours later. Benítez had cuts and fractures on his face. Some friends explained that he had recently been suffering from depression and, although he had a strong personality, they considered him "incapable of hitting a police officer." The "euphemistic" explanations given by the Catalan Minister of the Interior, Ramon Espadaler, and the director of the Mossos d'Esquadra, Manel Prat, at a press conference after the incident led to calls for their resignations.

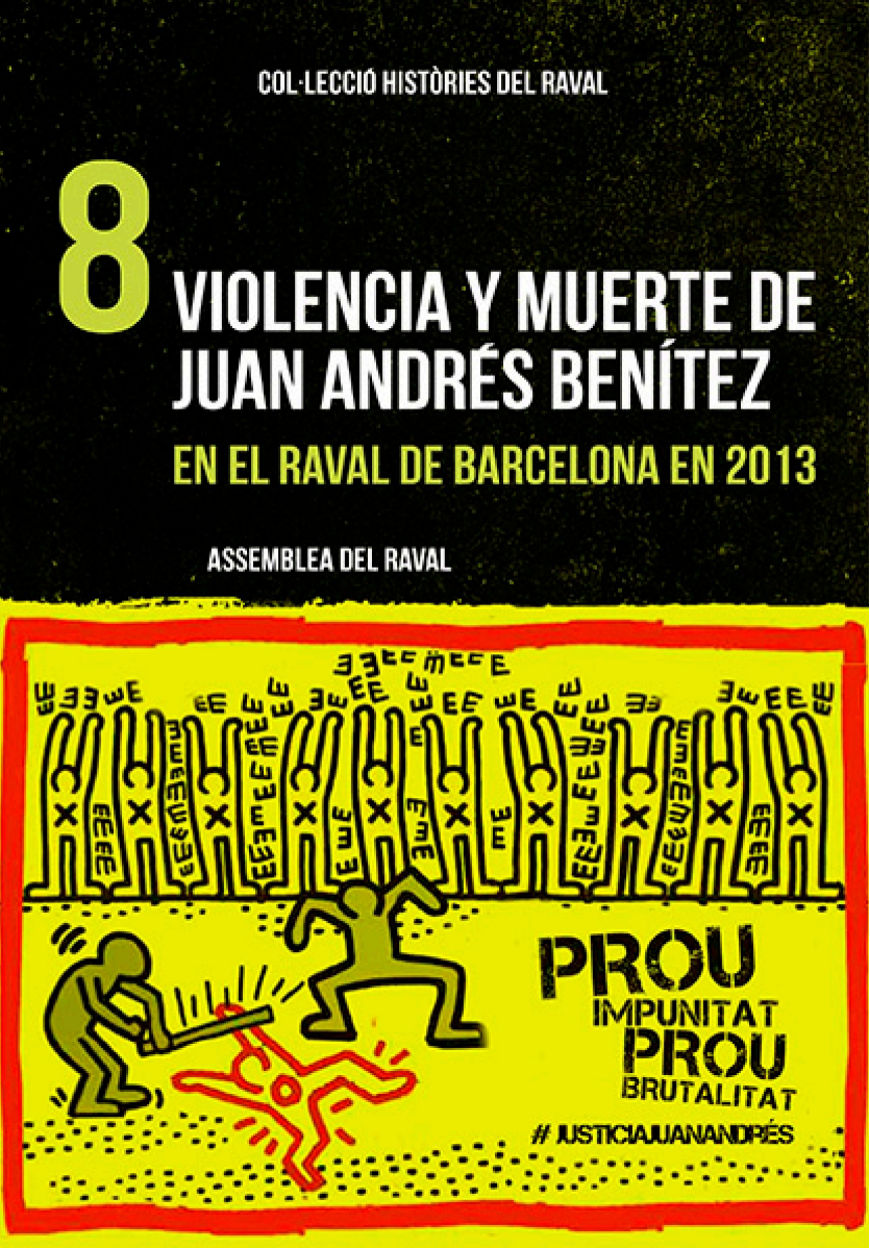
Book documenting the death of Juan Andrés Benítez by Mossos and the subsequent occupation of Àgora garden space in his memory.

=== Judicial process ===
Six police officers were charged for Benítez’s killing. The prosecution had requested 11 years in prison for them, but instead, a joint bail of €200,000 was set, and they were charged with serious crimes against moral integrity; two additional officers were charged with obstruction of justice for destroying evidence at the scene.

In 2016, the six officers were sentenced to two years in prison after reaching a conformity agreement endorsed by all parties: the prosecutor's office, the victim's family, and the Catalan Human Rights Association. Two other were found guilty of obstruction of justice. However, under the terms of the plea deal, the officers avoided actual imprisonment as long as they attended human rights workshops. They were also suspended from their jobs and salaries for two years and placed on probation for five years. The sentence caused unease within the Catalan Human Rights Association and the Justícia per a Andrés (Justice for Andrés) platform, which felt that the agreement endorsed police impunity.

== Legacy - Àgora Juan Andrés Benítez ==
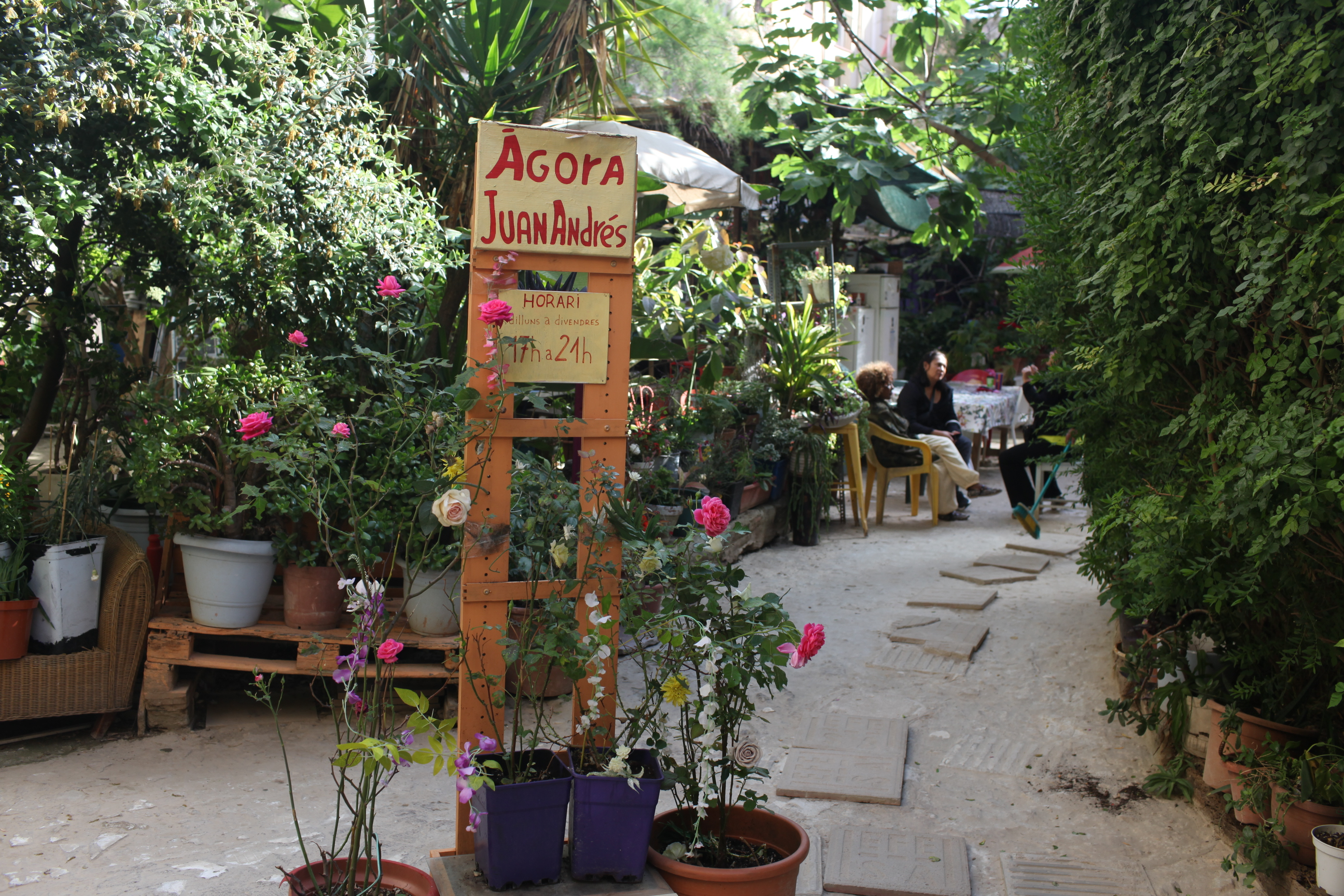
The entrance to Àgora Juan Andrés Benítez garden in Raval, Barcelona which is used by community organizing groups and provides much-needed green space in the neighborhood.

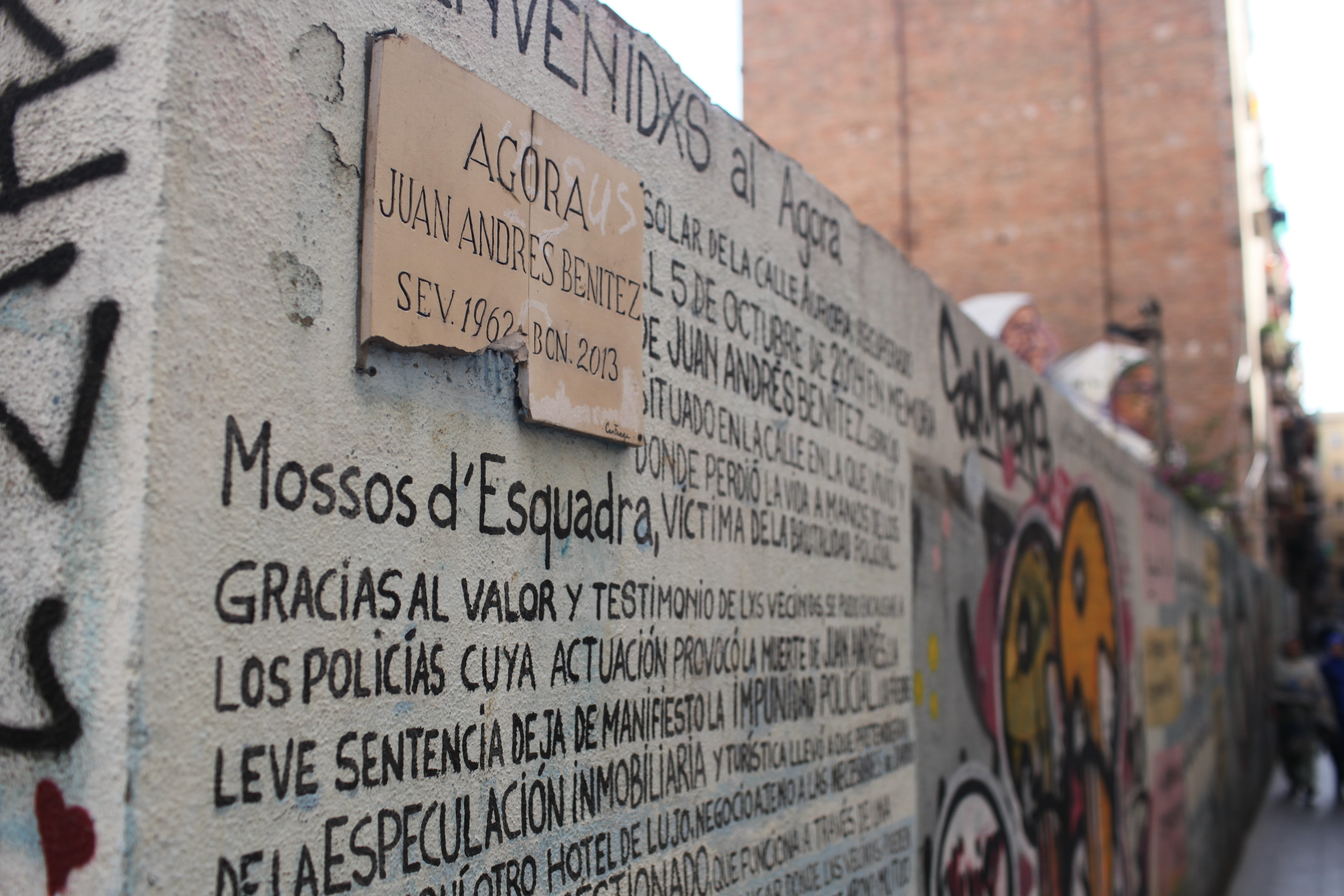
A mural outside Àgora Juan Andrés Benítez garden in Raval, Barcelona documents the story of Juan Andrés' death at the hands of Mossos in 2013.

In 2014, the empty terrain in Aurora street in Raval, Barcelona, where Juan Andrés Benítez was murdered, was occupied by community organizers in Barcelona, naming the space Àgora Juan Andrés Benítez in his memory.

The space has since been transformed into a community garden where different activities organized by various collectives continue to take place. At least 400 collectives have organized events in the garden since its occupation, including social kitchens, concerts, presentations of books among other mutual aid or cultural activities. Besides events or other actions that take place in the garden, it serves as a refuge against police brutality and against extreme heat, as it is situated in one of the most densely populated neighborhoods of Europe. According to an analysis completed by Valuing Impact, the social services provided by Àgora save the state government around 435,000 Euros per yer.

=== Eviction attempt ===
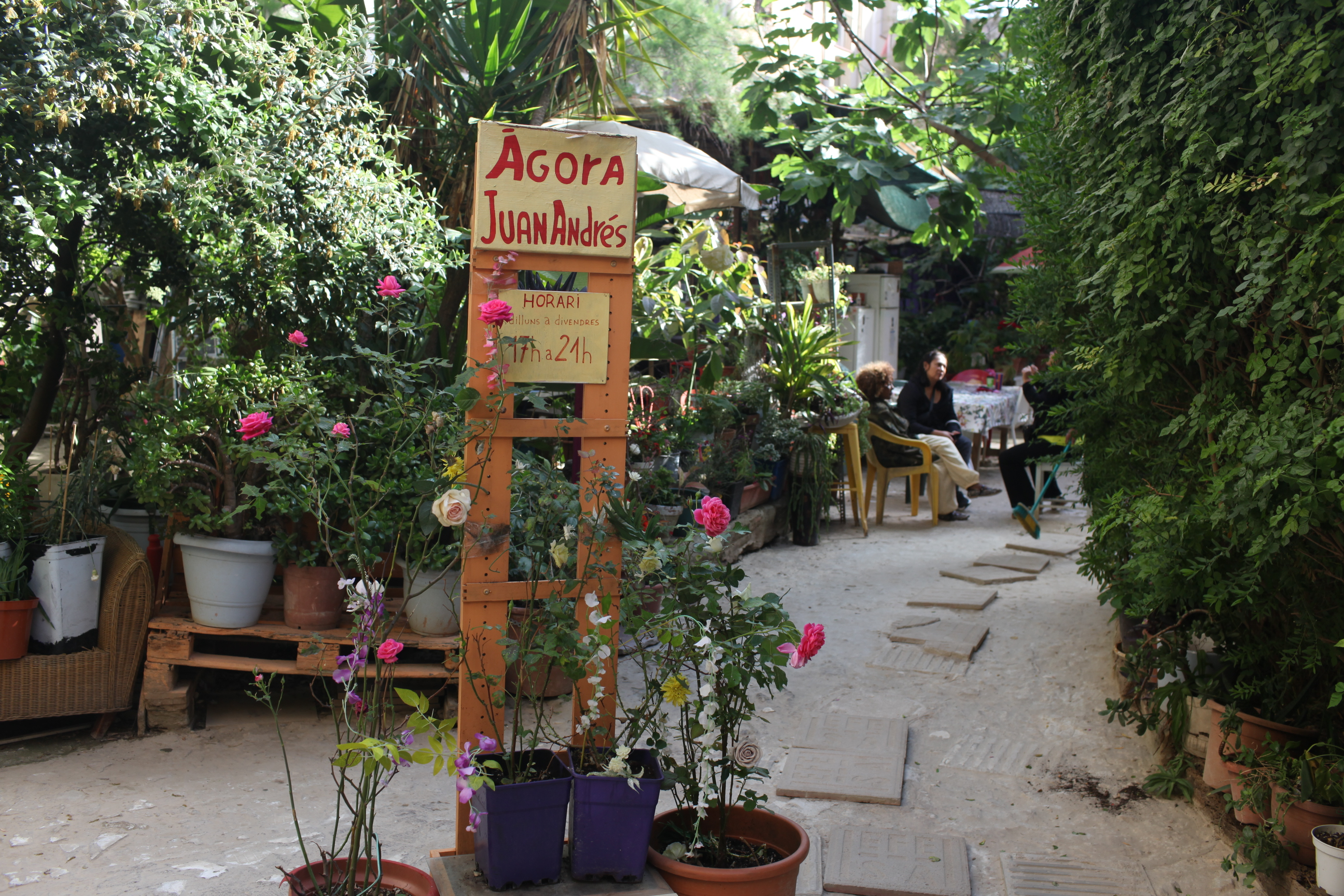
The entrance to Àgora Juan Andrés Benítez garden in Raval, Barcelona which is used by community organizing groups and provides much-needed green space in the neighborhood.

On April 29th, 2026, an eviction attempt of Àgora by Sareb was stopped as a result of the neighbors' mobilization where hundreds showed up to block the eviction. The subsequent eviction date for May 14th was postponed for early September 2026 after an anti-eviction campaign organized through open assemblies and large-scale mobilization, including protests, press releases, signature collections and public statements in favor of Àgora's self-determination.

== Further documentation ==
The story of the death of Juan Andrés Benítez and the subsequent occupation of the Àgora garden is documented in a book published in 2018 by El Lokal, a progressive cultural center located in Raval, Barcelona.

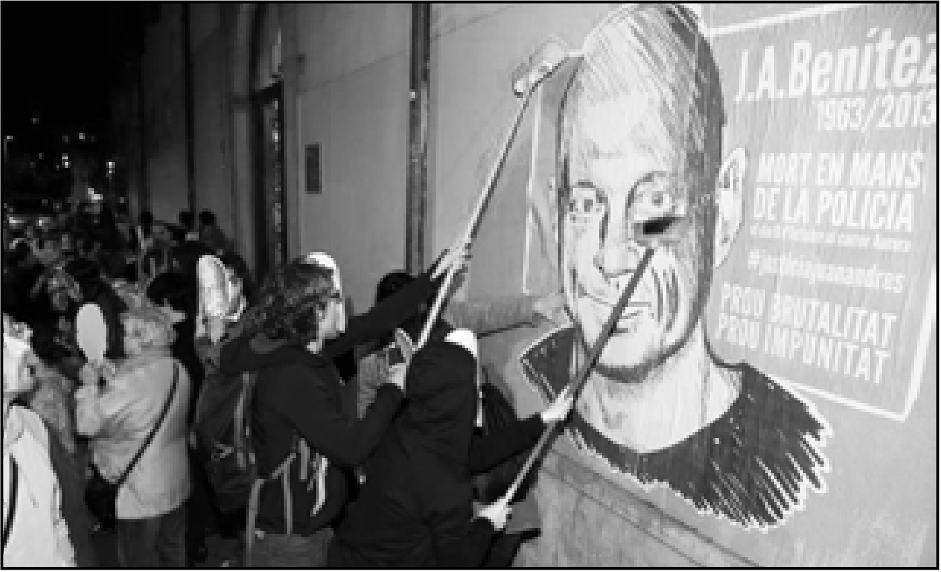
Protestors wearing masks of Juan Andrés Benítez plaster his face to a wall in Raval, Barcelona to call attention to police violence in the neighborhood.

In addition, the yearly memorial services and protests in memory of Juan Andrés Benítez have been documented by the Barcelona-based photography collective Fotomovomiento.

== See also ==
- Frente de Liberación Gay de Catalunya
