= Abduction of Insiya Hemani =

- Petition for the return of Insiya, presented by her mother to the Dutch Ministry of Foreign Affairs (8 March 2017).
- Date: September 29, 2016 – Today
- Time: approx. 08:15 (CEST)
- Location: Abduction: Watergraafsmeer, Amsterdam, the Netherlands Confinement: Bandra, Mumbai, India.
- Type: Kidnapping, international child abduction
- Motive: parental dispute
- Perpetrators: Insiya's father, Shehzad Hemani; Six acclompices
- Verdict: Guilty (trial in absentia)
- Sentence: 8.5 years in prison (father)

The abduction of Insiya Hemani refers to the international child abduction of a two-year-old Dutch girl from Amsterdam to India on 29 September 2016. Her father, Shehzad Hemani, arranged the abduction with the assistance of several accomplices. Insiya was taken to Mumbai, where she has remained with her father.

Between 2019 and 2025, Hemani and six co-defendants were convicted in the Netherlands for their involvement in the abduction. In November 2025, the Supreme Court of the Netherlands upheld the convictions, making them final. Hemani received a prison sentence of eight and a half years.

== Background ==
Insiya Hemani is the daughter of Nadia Rashid and Shehzad Shabbirali Hemani. She was born in Amsterdam in 2014, acquiring Dutch citizenship by birth. The family lived in Mumbai until Rashid travelled to the Netherlands with Insiya and her other daughter on 7 December 2014.

Rashid is a Dutch-Pakistani industrial and organizational psychologist who in 2024 became a lawyer, and Hemani is an Indian businessman based in Mumbai. The couple married in 2011 but later separated, with Rashid filing for divorce in 2015. Following custody proceedings in the Netherlands, Insiya was placed in her mother's care, while her father was granted supervised visitation rights.

== Abduction ==
On the morning of 29 September 2016, three men entered the home of Insiya's maternal grandmother in Watergraafsmeer, a neighbourhood in Amsterdam. They seized the child and took her to a waiting car. During the incident, one of the men used an electric stun device against Insiya's aunt and a neighbour who had intervened. He was overpowered and detained by family members and neighbours.

The two other men took Insiya to a meeting point in Eemnes (Utrecht), where her father took custody of her. Hemani and several accomplices subsequently travelled through Germany to India, taking Insiya to Mumbai.

== Authority response ==
The Dutch authorities issued an Amber alert on the day of the abduction and launched an international search. The Dutch police published a search notice on the same day under the category 'Withdrawn from parental authority', with case number 2016211226. This search notice is still active in 2026.

At the request of the Dutch Public Prosecution Service, Interpol issued an international "Diffusion" notice against Hemani and a "Yellow Notice" for Insiya. Following legal proceedings initiated by Hemani in the Bombay High Court, the Diffusion notice was temporarily withdrawn in 2018; Dutch prosecutors subsequently requested its reinstatement.

== Criminal proceedings ==
In July 2019, six accomplices were convicted by the District Court of Amsterdam for their involvement in the abduction. In October 2020, Hemani was sentenced in absentia to nine years in prison for instigating and participating in the abduction and removing Insiya from her mother's parental custody.

On 13 May 2024, the Amsterdam Court of Appeal upheld the convictions. Hemani's sentence was reduced to eight and a half years because of the excessive length of the proceedings. The other defendants received prison sentences ranging from four weeks to four years.

On 4 November 2025, the Supreme Court of the Netherlands dismissed the appeals in five cases, making the convictions and sentences final.

== Custody and efforts to secure her return ==
Under Dutch law, parental responsibility (ouderlijk gezag) gives parents the right and duty to care for and raise their minor children and to make important decisions on their behalf. Parents who are married generally retain joint parental responsibility after divorce, unless a court orders otherwise. A parent with joint parental responsibility cannot normally relocate a child abroad without the other parent's consent or permission from a court. In international child abduction cases, taking a child across national borders in breach of the other parent's custody rights may therefore constitute wrongful removal, even when the person taking the child is the child's parent.

Shehzad Hemani petitioned a Dutch court for Insiya's return to India under the Hague Convention on the Civil Aspects of International Child Abduction. The District Court of The Hague rejected his request on 6 July 2015, a decision upheld by the Court of Appeal in The Hague on 19 August 2015.

In March 2017, the Netherlands submitted a formal extradition request for Shehzad Hemani to India. India rejected this request; according to subsequent reports, the refusal was based on the absence of a directly applicable extradition treaty and the existence of ongoing custody proceedings in India.

In January 2018, the Family Court in Bandra, Mumbai, ordered Hemani to transfer Insiya to her mother by 27 March 2018. The ruling was challenged by her father. On 13 April 2018, the Bombay High Court overturned the order, ruling that the custody dispute required further examination by the Family Court. It directed the Family Court to decide the custody proceedings within one year.

In March 2019, a Dutch court revoked Hemani's parental authority over Insiya. Rashid was granted sole custody, and a subsequent Dutch court ruling ordered Insiya's return to the Netherlands.

The case has been raised repeatedly in diplomatic discussions between the Netherlands and India, as well as in the Dutch parliament and the European Parliament. Rashid has also campaigned publicly for her daughter's return under the name Bring Insiya Back.

== Current situation ==
As of 2026, Insiya lives with her father in Mumbai. The Dutch criminal convictions against Hemani and his co-defendants are final, but efforts to secure her return have not resulted in her return to the Netherlands. The Dutch government has continued diplomatic efforts to facilitate contact between Insiya and her mother.

In November 2026, it was reported that Google had blocked access in India to articles about the case published by several Dutch media outlets, including AT5 and NOS. Google stated that the restrictions followed a court order describing the publications as defamatory and false. Insiya's mother, Nadia Rashid, also reported that her social media account had been blocked. She suggested that the restrictions were intended to prevent Insiya, who was then 12 years old, from learning about her past. In November 2026, Amsterdam mayor Femke Halsema recorded a video message in Mumbai during a trade mission to India, calling on the Dutch government to take action to secure Insiya's return. The video also included a message from Insiya's mother. Halsema encouraged her followers to share the video in the hope that it would reach Insiya, despite restrictions on online publications about the case in India. The message was published on Halsema's social media account on 22 November.
