= Sant Pau del Camp =

Church and former monastery in Barcelona, Catalonia, Spain

Coordinates: 41°22′35″N 2°10′10″E

Sant Pau del Camp

Sant Pau del Camp (Catalan for 'Saint Paul of the countryside' / 'in the fields'; IPA: [ˈsam ˈpaw ðəl ˈkam]) is a church and former monastery in Barcelona, Catalonia, Spain. While the monastery now stands within the El Raval district in central Barcelona, it once stood outside the city (before 14th century); its rural location gave the church its name.

== History ==
There are no sources about the monastery's origins, it is generally thought that it was founded by count Wilfred II of Barcelona, whose funerary inscription was found within the monastery in 1596. The monastery is documented from 977; in 985 it was sacked and destroyed by the Muslim troops of al-Mansur Ibn Abi Aamir.

Restorations were begun in 1096, through donations from Geribert Guitard and Rotlendis, and a new monastic community arrived. In 1117, Sant Pau became a priory of the monastery of Sant Cugat. By the 13th, a new cloister, church and monastic quarters were built. In 1377, the monastery consisted of a prior and eight monks, which declined in the 15th century to consist of three monks. An initial monastic meeting for the Terragona province occurred in 1577 and such meetings would continue from 1594 to 1835.

The monks were removed upon the secularization of monasteries by the Spanish government in 1835.

It was declared a National Monument in 1879.

== Architecture ==
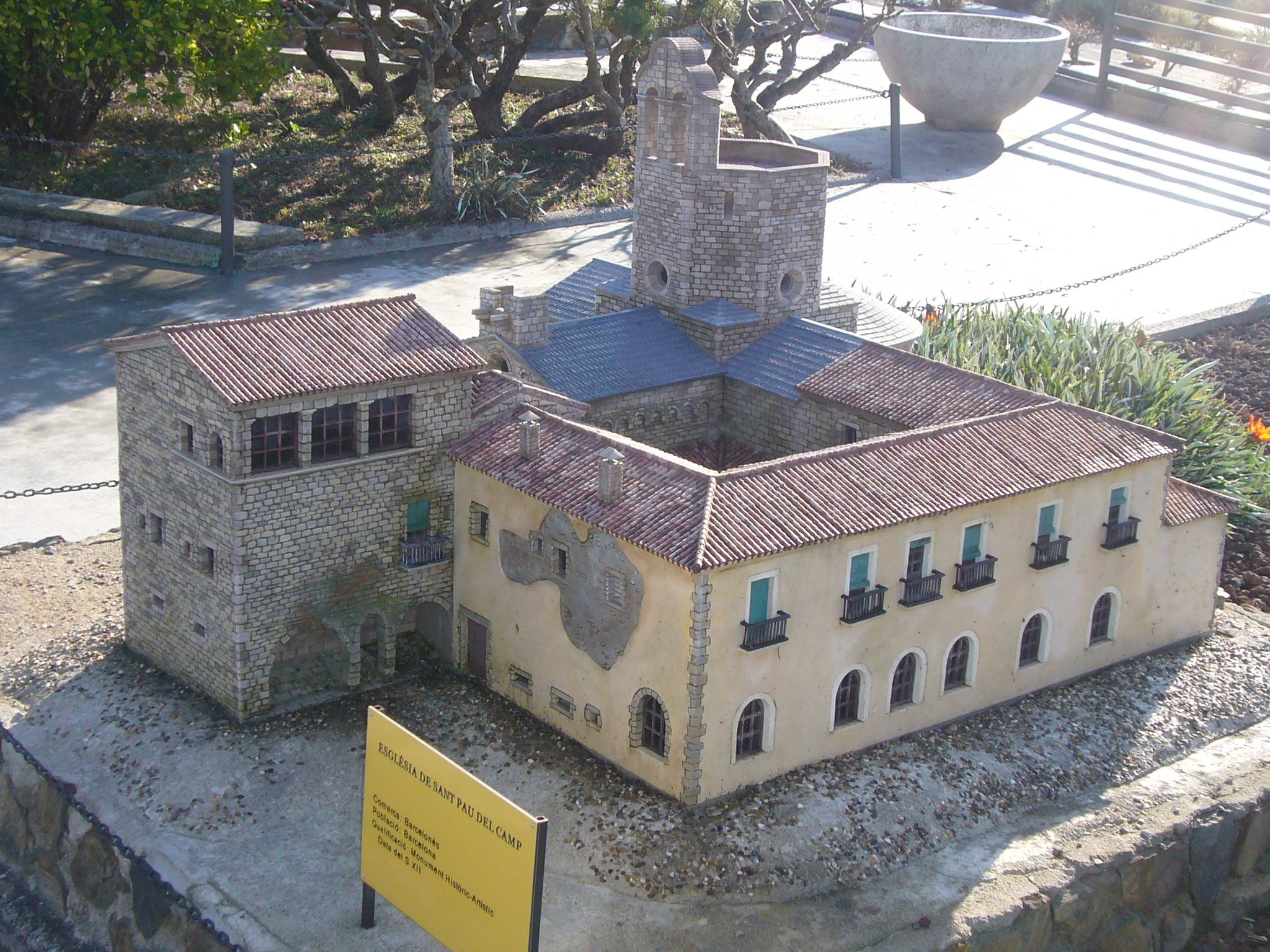
Scale model of Sant Pau del Camp, at the Catalunya en Miniatura park

The Romanesque monastery has a small cloister, built in the 13th century. It features lobular arcades supported by double columns, whose capitals are decorated by biblical and daily life scenes, animals, monsters and vegetable motifs. The abbots' house was built in the 13th-14th and early 18th century.

The church is on the Greek cross plan, with a single aisle. It has a transept with three apses, and the interior is covered by barrel vaults. The entrance doorway has two columns with ancient marble Visigothic capitals, while in the tympanum is depicted Christ in Majesty with Saints Paul and Peter.

The chapter house (14th century) houses the tomb of the supposed founder of the monastery, Wilfred II.

== See also ==
- High medieval domes
