= Displacement =

Displacement may refer to:

== Physical sciences ==
=== Mathematics and physics ===
- Displacement (geometry), the difference between the final and initial position of a point trajectory (for instance, the center of mass of a moving object). The actual path covered to reach the final position is irrelevant.
  - Particle displacement, a measurement of distance of the movement of a particle in a medium as it transmits a wave (represented in mathematics by the lower-case Greek letter ξ)
  - Displacement field (mechanics), an assignment of displacement vectors for all points in a body that is displaced from one state to another
  - Electric displacement field, a vector field which appears in Maxwell's equations
- Wien's displacement law, a relation concerning the spectral distribution of blackbody radiation
- Angular displacement, a change in orientation of a rigid body, the amount of rotation about a fixed axis.

=== Engineering ===
- Engine displacement, the total volume of air/fuel mixture an engine can draw in during one complete engine cycle
- Displacement (fluid), an object immersed in a fluid pushes the fluid out of the way
- Positive displacement meter, a pump or flow meter which processes a definite fluid volume per revolution
- Displacement has several meanings related to ships and boats
  - Displacement hull, where the moving hull's weight is supported by buoyancy alone and it must displace water from its path rather than planing on the water's surface
  - Displacement speed, a rule of thumb for non planing watercraft to estimate their theoretical maximum speed
  - Displacement (ship), the weight of a ship
- Insulation displacement connector, a type of electrical connector
- Displacement mapping, a technique in 3D computer graphics

=== Chemistry ===
- Single displacement reaction, a chemical reaction concerning the exchange of ions
- Double displacement reaction, a chemical reaction concerning the exchange of ions
- Radioactive displacement law of Fajans and Soddy, elements/isotopes created during radioactive decay

=== Geology ===
- Earth Crustal Displacement, an aspect of the Pole shift hypothesis

== Medicine ==
- Displacement (orthopedic surgery), change in alignment of the fracture fragments

== Social sciences ==
- Displacement (linguistics), the ability of humans (and possibly some animals) to communicate ideas that are remote in time and/or space
- Forced displacement, by persecution or violence
- Displacement (psychology), a sub-conscious defense mechanism
- Displacement (parapsychology), a statistical or qualitative correspondence between targets and responses.
- Development-induced displacement, the displacement of population for economic development
- Displacement is a component of gentrification.

== Sport ==
- Displacement (fencing), a movement that avoids or dodges an attack

== Economy ==
- Layoff

== Other ==
- Child displacement

== See also ==
- Offset (disambiguation)
- Transformation (geometry)
