= El Raval =

Human settlement in Ciutat Vella, Barcelona, Barcelonès, Spain

Coordinates: 41°22′47″N 2°10′5″E

- Neighborhood of Barcelona
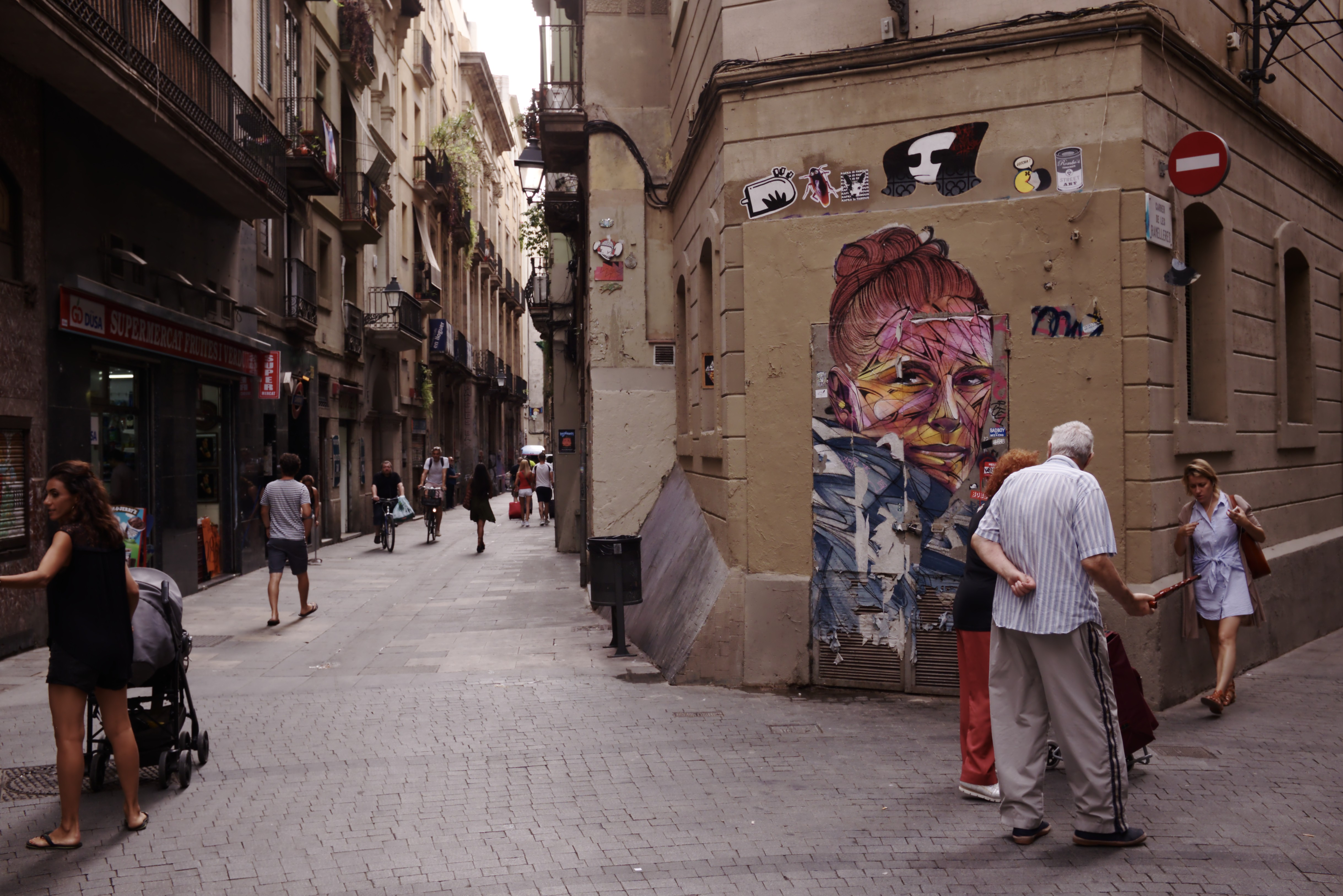
- Carrer Tallers

- Map of El Raval within Barcelona
- Country: Spain
- Autonomous Community: Catalonia
- Province: Barcelona
- Comarca: Barcelonès
- Municipality: Barcelona
- District: Ciutat Vella

Population (2023)
  - Total: 45,671
- Postal code: 08001
- Website: ajuntament.barcelona.cat

El Raval (Catalan pronunciation: [əl rəˈβal], Spanish pronunciation: [el raˈβal]) is a neighborhood in the Ciutat Vella district of Barcelona, the capital city of Catalonia. The neighborhood, especially the part closest to the old port, was formerly (informally) known as Barri Xinès or Barrio Chino, meaning "Chinatown". El Raval is one of the two historical neighborhoods that border La Rambla, the other being the Barri Gòtic; it contains some 50,000 people.

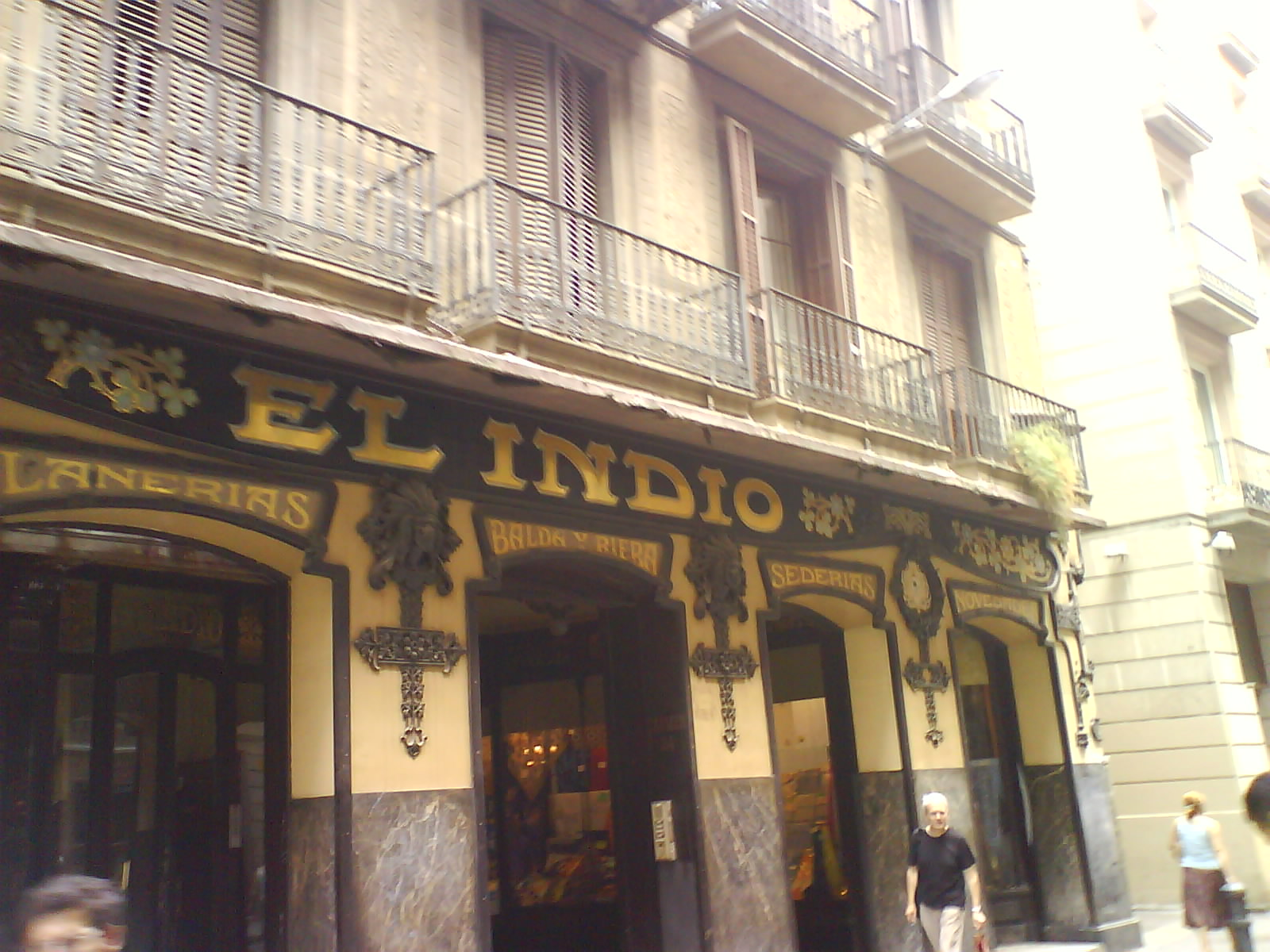
Carrer del Carme.

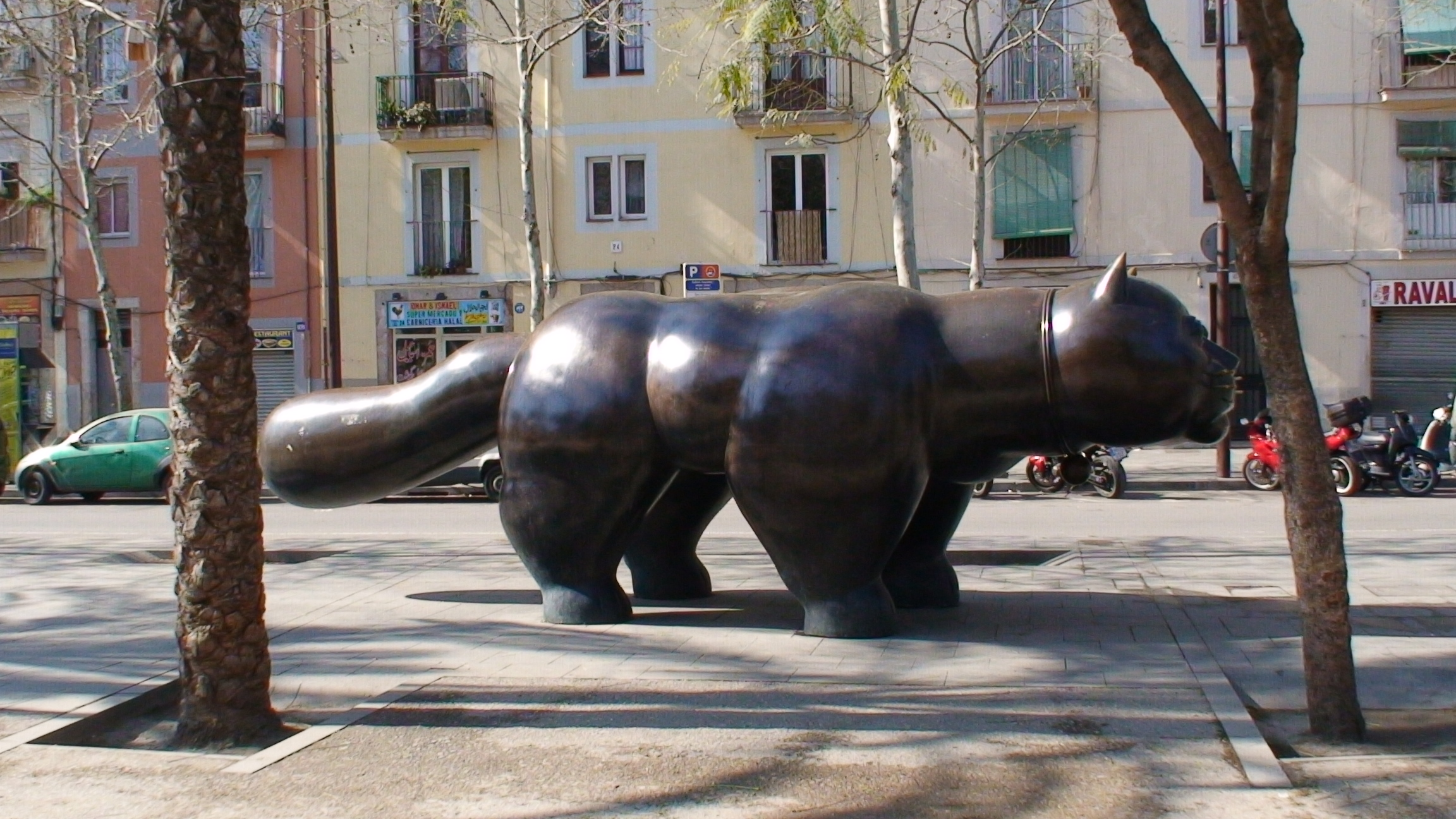
El Gat de Botero (The Raval Cat), by Botero

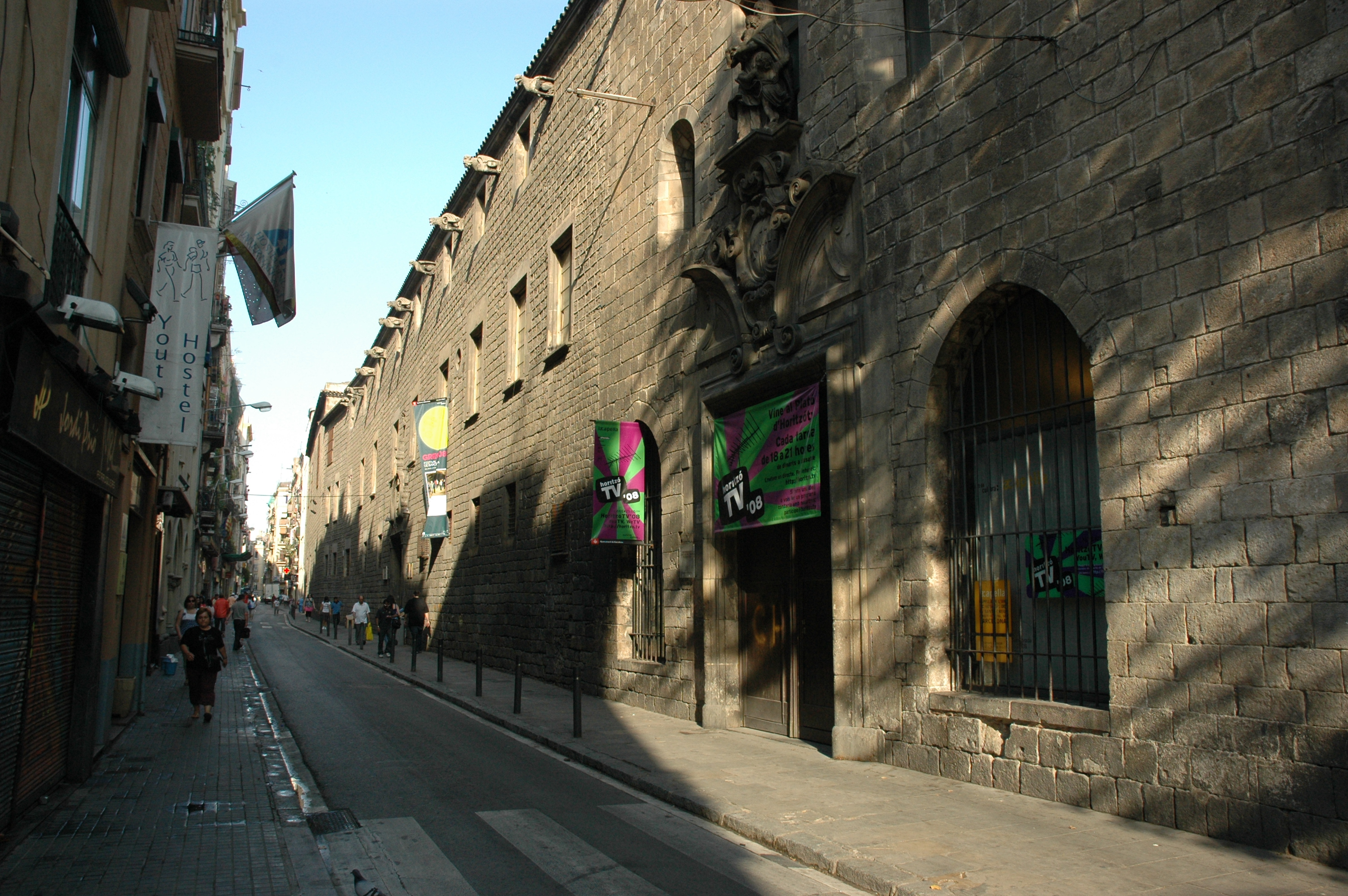
Carrer de l'Hospital.

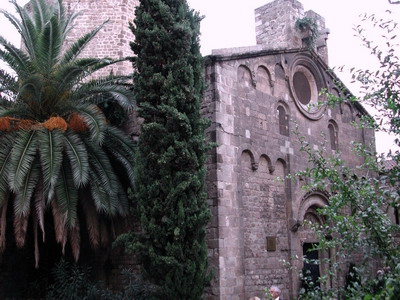
Sant Pau del Camp church.

An area historically infamous for its nightlife and cabarets, as well as prostitution and crime, El Raval has changed significantly in recent years and due to its central location has become a minor attraction of Barcelona. It currently has a very diverse immigrant community (47.4% of its population was born abroad, ranging from Filipinos, South Americans, and Pakistanis, to a more recent Eastern European community, especially from Romania). It is home to many bars and restaurants, as well as community spaces and collectives.

== History ==
The territory of the El Raval neighborhood was first populated more than 6,000 years ago. The population significantly increased with the arrival of the Romans in the second century. This agricultural area and peasant population provided most of the food for the few thousand inhabitants of the city of Barcino, now known as Barcelona.

The first walls around the settlement were built in the fourth century but El Raval was not within it - a persistent position for many centuries to follow. Known for its poor rural and disease prone character it wasn't much of an interest for the Arabic invaders in the eighth century either but their mark remained nevertheless. The name Raval comes from arabic word (rabád) meaning suburb or outskirts and it's where it remained until the 14th century. As Barcelona grew, Raval kept its suburban character and function with convents, hospitals, and mills that took advantage of the available rural space.

Population significantly increased in the 19th century with the dawn of the Industrial Revolution (and notably Barcelona’s World Fairs of 1888 and 1929 that brought about a surge in employment opportunities). The construction of many factories attracted migrant workers (both from Spain and abroad) giving the neighbourhood its distinctive character of the most industrialised, polluted and demographically complex parts of the city. Dominant was the textile industry, but other industries such as brick production, slaughterhouses and leather manufacturing were also located in El Raval.

By 1850s tenement blocks for the workers transformed the neighborhood into one of the most densely-populated areas. Industrialisation escalated the need for urban reform that gradually brought about the demolition of the walls between 1854 and 1856 and led to strategic transformation and expansion of the city - Cerdà plan.

During the First World War local industry flourished attracting even more workers. Spain that remained neutral became a supplier for many of the ravaged European countries. During these times marginalised and illegal activities (nightlife, prostitution, smuggling...) increased and concentrated in the southern part of Raval, influencing the perception of the area framed by the authorities as an urban problem, a perspective that drove several attempts to erase the neighbourhood in the decades to follow. The new name of the barrio `El Barrio Chino´ (Chinatown) emerged then, in 1925 by the journalist Francisco Madrid, although there was no Chinese or Asian population living there, relating to its high density, cosmopolitanism and exoticism, that referenced a popular conception of other Chinatowns of the world. The name has stuck to this day.

A detailed plan (Pla Especial de Reforma Interior, PERI) for the Raval was passed in 1985 as part of the Pla General Metropolità (Metropolitan Master Plan) of 1976. In the 1985 the architects Xavier Sust and Carles Díaz proposed a system of public spaces to be created in the dense urban fabric of the Raval, from the popular South sector (bombed during the 1936-1939 Spanish Civil War) to the North sector, where a cultural hub of museums and university faculties was to be built, reusing and transforming the many abandoned religious buildings.

=== 1992 Olympics: The Surgical Approach that transformed the neighbourhood and the city ===
Barcelona’s Olympic candidacy changed the understanding of whom urban infrastructure is for and brought about a new urban strategy of the city that has transformed it profoundly. These new strategic interventions focused on the economy of culture and leisure that changed the character of many neighbourhoods but El Raval especially and amounted to the loss of historic infrastructure. Most notable was the construction of the Rambla del Raval (1996-2001) followed by demolition of almost 3,000 houses and commercial premises resulting in the displacement of thousands of residents. This was one of the first major gentrification projects in the city. Additionally new housing blocks have been constructed at both ends of the Rambla, and existing buildings were renovated for use as student accommodation. The development cost more than 5 million euros and was 80% subsidized by the EU Social Cohesion Fund.

The second big operation was the MACBA (The Museu d’Art Contemporani de Barcelona) that opened in 1995. The museum attracted art students, galleries, alternative spaces, and bars and the plaza around the museum became a gathering point for skaters, tourists, and residents from every background — one of the genuinely democratic public spaces in the city.

All these projects brought about a lot of controversies and upheaval in the neighbourhood because of the surge of tourism and rising housing prices that consequently forced out long-term residents over time and transformed the character of the area.

== Social struggles ==
El Raval is known for its nightlife, bar scene, markets, and restaurants, but also for the concentration of sex work and drugs which have led to conceptions of El Raval as a more risky and unsafe neighbourhood. This is partially due to the wealth gaps and disparity of class backgrounds between those visiting for the “popular attractions” and cosmopolitan scene, and the residents of the area who typically come from working class backgrounds, and has resultingly created conflicting connotations and lived experiences between those living in the neighbourhood and other residents of Barcelona.

Additionally, already supporting the highest population density of Barcelona, El Raval is currently struggling against the process of gentrification, initiated by urban development plans that aim to increase tourism and aesthetic appeal of El Raval. If the pressures of gentrification and subsequent tourism continue to rise, longstanding residents will face expulsion in the face of unaffordable housing prices that favour higher social classes and Airbnb-type tourism rentals. As such, El Raval is one of the top neighbourhoods in Barcelona with the highest number of tourism rental apartments, accounting for 11% of the city’s total on offer, despite El Raval representing only 2.9% of Barcelona’s overall population. These disproportionate figures exemplify the extent of potential threat the residents of El Raval face in response to tourism and gentrification, and leaning to explain the social struggles occurring in the area. The rise of tourism and subsequent ‘regeneration schemes’ particularly conflate with the multicultural component that characterises El Raval, having produced alterations to the social, economic and environmental aspects of the area. There has been subsequent criticism towards the lack of consideration and inclusion of the interests of local residents in the creation and implementation of urban renewal programmes, demonstrated in past and ongoing social struggles in El Raval today.

== Social movements ==
Raval’s resistance to social injustice is ignited by a diverse range of actors, including grassroots, tenants unions, social movements, cultural institutions and NGOs. These groups have different political motivations and long term objectives, they work to protect the neighbourhood’s social fabric, ethnic diversity, as well as residents from gentrification and displacement.

=== “No to MACBA’s expansion” ===
There has been opposition to the expansion of Barcelona’s contemporary art museum MACBA, whose visitors are mostly tourists, accounting for 91% of attendance. After years of campaigning for the development of a healthcare centre in the neighbourhood, in 2013 the municipality of Barcelona granted the intended space of Capella de la Misericòrdia as an extension of the MACBA. Organised neighbors and healthcare workers occupied the space in 2019, protesting against the ignored needs of Raval’s residents. Following the mobilisation the tourist and culture expansion was cancelled. From 2025, MACBA is pursuing a new expansion project on its frontage at Placa dels Angles, a 1,200m² public square which is the biggest public space in the city’s most densely populated neighbourhood. La Xarxa Veïnal del Raval (Raval Neighborhood Network) is opposing the expansion and has filed a lawsuit against this decision.

==== Community spaces ====
Raval has many spaces dedicated to community building among the neighbours and resistance. One of the most notable examples is Agora - Juan Andres Benitez, an occupied community garden characterised as urban commons. The space was occupied after the death of a gay local, and today serves as an open kitchen for migrants, an assembly and event space for social groups, and a climate refuge for Raval’s residents. Another example is Ateneu del Raval which is a grassroots cultural centre. It serves as a vital social space for neighborhood residents, offering a variety of activities, artistic performances, and community organizing.

Metzineres is a non-profit cooperative providing sheltered environments for womxn - including trans women, non-binary people, and women of colour. It focuses on human rights and gender mainstreaming by covering a full spectrum of harm reduction approaches. The cooperative offers immediate support to affected womxn varying from covering basic needs, self-protection, empowerment and training opportunities.

Antiga Massana was one of Raval’s biggest squats, occupying the previous building of the abandoned prestigious public art school called Massana, which moved to a new location in Barcelona. The squat had a community gym, food distribution centre, free language classes that helped migrants integrate better, a school, and a space for artistic expression. It acted as an important meeting point for housing activists and grassroot organising, as the squad offered an anti-racist and LGBTQI-friendly environment. In January 2025, Antiga Massana got evicted through a surprise police operation in the early hours of a morning. The eviction sparked massive public response, with thousands of people gathering throughout the day to defend Antiga Massana. Despite the huge mobilisation, efforts to prevent the permanent eviction were unsuccessful.

Sindicat d’Habitatge del Raval is a tenant's union and Raval Rebel is a grassroots anti-capitalist group, both oppose gentrification and advocate for socially just housing conditions and rights. The groups support residents against planned evictions, illegal rent hikes and exploitation by landlords. They hold weekly open assemblies in which local neighbours participate and receive support and solidarity.

Putas Indignadas (Indignant Prostitutes) also known as Putas Libertarias is a collective and an alliance of sex workers standing up to institutional and police persecution. The group works to protect sex workers from racist and sexist attacks, fight for rights and alleviate the social stigma around sex work.

Tot Raval is a foundation of fifty social entities, education centres and cultural institutions which works to improve the quality of life in the Raval neighborhood of Barcelona. It aims to foster social cohesion, coexistence and a sense of belonging in the neighbourhood through institutional change. The foundation is funded by big institutions which limit its action and stance on campaigning against police brutality and evictions.

== Boundaries ==
The northern border of the neighborhood is marked by Plaça Catalunya and Plaça Universitat, and the street which connects them, Carrer de Pelai. It ends in the east with La Rambla, and in the west and south, the neighborhood is bordered by Ronda de Sant Antoni, Ronda de Sant Pau and Avinguda del Paral·lel.

== Landmarks ==
There are a few historical monuments such as the Monastery of Sant Pau del Camp, as well as newer additions such as the Rambla del Raval, and the MACBA (the Contemporary Art Museum of Barcelona) or the Centre de Cultura Contemporània de Barcelona. Near the museum is the mural Todos Juntos Podemos Parar el SIDA, originally created by American artist Keith Haring in 1989.

In the southern part of the neighborhood an old wall and gate of the medieval city called Portal de Santa Madrona still exists as part of the Maritime Museum. The Raval is also known for its large statue of a cat by Fernando Botero, located on the Rambla del Raval. The city's most famous market, La Boqueria, is also situated in the Raval.

In the eastern part of the neighborhood, Antoni Gaudí's Palau Güell is located on the Carrer Nou de la Rambla.

== Transport ==
=== Barcelona Metro ===
- Drassanes (L3)
- Liceu (L3)
- Paral·lel (L2, L3)
- Sant Antoni (L2)

== Cultural depictions ==
- Josep Maria de Sagarra's 1932 book Vida Privada
- S.I.E. Films' 1937 film Barrios Bajos
- Rafael Gil's 1948 film La calle sin sol
- Jean Genet's 1949 book, The Thief's Journal (Journal du Voleur)
- Joan Colom's photos of the neighborhood in the 1950s
- Eduardo Mendoza's 1975 book La verdad sobre el caso Savolta
- Terenci Moix's 1976 book La caiguda de l'imperi sodomita
- José Antonio de la Loma's 1977 film Las alegres chicas de El Molino
- Ivà's comic strip Makinavaja, started in 1986.
- Francisco Casavella's 1990 book El Triunfo
- Maruja Torres's 1997 book Un calor tan cercano
- Francisco Casavella's 1997 book Un enano español se suicida en Las Vegas
- Roberto Bolaño's 1998 novel The Savage Detectives
- José Luis Guerin's 2001 documentary En construcción
- Carlos Ruiz Zafón's 2001 novel The Shadow of the Wind
- Francisco Casavella's 2002-2003 book trilogy El día del Watusi
- Cesc Gay's 2003 film En la ciudad
- Pau Miró's 2004 play Llueve en Barcelona
- Joaquim Jordà's 2005 film De nens
- Juan Marsé's 2005 book Canciones de amor en Lolita's Club
- Mireia Ros's 2005 film El Triunfo
- Ferran Aisa i Mei Vidal, 2006 book El Raval, un espail al marge
- Antoni Verdaguer's 2006 film Raval, Raval...
- Fernando Gómez's 2008 book El misterio de la Calle Poniente
- Marc Pastor's 2009 book La mala dona
- Francesc Betriu's 2009 documentary Mónica del Raval
- Jo Sol's 2009 film The Runner's Salary
- Javier Calvo's 2009 novel Corona de Flores
- Maruja Torres's 2009 book Esperadme en el cielo
- Alejandro González Iñárritu's 2010 film Biutiful
- Javier Zuloaga's 2011 novel Librería Libertad
- Mathias Énard's 2012 novel Rue des voleurs
- Xavier Artigas and Xapo Ortega's 2014 documentary Ciutat morta
- Pol Rodriguez's 2026 miniseries Ravalejar

== People from Raval ==
- Enriqueta Martí, serial killer known as the Vampyre of Barcelona.
- Terenci Moix, writer.
- Peret, singer.
- Maruja Torres, writer.
- Manuel Vázquez Montalbán, writer.
- Andreu Jacob, film music composer

== See also ==
- Carrer de Joaquín Costa, a street in Raval.
- La Paloma
- Pakistanis in Spain
- Urban planning of Barcelona
- Àgora Juan Andrés Benítez
