= Murder of Anda Maria Gyurca =

2025 murder in Romania

- Location: Miheșu de Câmpie, Mureș, Romania
- Date: July 8, 2025; 08:50
- Attack type: Aggravated murder, arson, domestic violence
- Deaths: 1
- Victim: Anda Maria Gyurca (aged 23)
- Perpetrator: Emil Gânj
- Motive: Domestic violence (alleged)
- Charges: Aggravated murder, destruction of property, desecration of corpses, trespassing, violation of a protection order
- Verdict: Sent to trial in absentia (2026)

The murder of Anda Maria Gyurca, also known as the Gânj Case, was a case of murder that occurred on July 8, 2025, where 23-year-old Anda Maria Gyurca was murdered by her former partner, Emil Gânj (born March 7, 1988), in the commune of Miheșu de Câmpie, Mureș County. Gânj, a recidivist previously convicted of murder, violated a protection order, struck her fatally with an axe, then set fire to her corpse and her home.

The case drew public attention due to alleged repeated institutional failures of the Police and the Prosecutor's Office, which reportedly ignored previous signs of domestic violence. Emil Gânj remained on the run, being wanted nationally and internationally, and was sent to trial in absentia for multiple offenses.

== Background ==
Emil Gânj, aged 37 at the time of the offense, had been previously sentenced to 15 years and 6 months in prison for murder, being conditionally released before the end of his term in January 2020. The relationship with Anda Gyurca was marked by repeated episodes of violence:

- 16 February 2024: Anda is severely physically assaulted by Gânj.
- 18 February 2024: The Police are called by Anda's father and arrive at the address where he lived, but do not find him there.
- 20 February 2024: The Luduș Local Court issues a protection order for a period of six months.
- 22 February 2024: The victim withdraws her complaint; the protection order is canceled on 27 March 2024 by the Mureș Tribunal.
- February 2025: Gânj kidnaps the victim and sets fire to her home; the police note violations of the ordered measures, but he manages to evade apprehension.

== Murder ==
On 8 July 2025, at around 08:50, Gânj entered the courtyard of the victim's home in Miheșu de Câmpie, breaking the windows and the door with an axe, then struck her fatally in the head area. Subsequently, he doused the body with gasoline, set it on fire, and set fire to the residence before fleeing the scene. The event was captured by a surveillance camera installed by the family.

The charred corpse was later discovered by authorities; the murder took place shortly after the departure of the police crew that had provided security during the night.

== Aftermath ==
The case sparked public debates regarding domestic violence and the effectiveness of protection orders in Romania, being compared in the press to the "Caracal case".

== See also ==
- Kidnapping of Alexandra Măceșanu and Luiza Melencu
