= Kidnapping of Alexandra Măceșanu and Luiza Melencu =

2019 murder in Caracal, Romania

- Arrested: Gheorghe Dincă
- Accused of: Kidnapping, rape and murder of Luiza Melencu and Alexandra Măceșanu

The kidnapping of Alexandra Măceșanu and Luiza Melencu happened in Caracal, Olt County, Romania in April and on 25 July 2019. Romanian police were heavily criticized for taking 19 hours to locate and search the building where Alexandra Măceșanu was held captive. The handling of the case met widespread outrage and protests, which led to the dismissal of Interior Minister Nicolae Moga and other officials.

== The kidnapping ==
Fifteen-year-old Alexandra Măceșanu went missing on 24 July while hitchhiking from her village Dobrosloveni to Caracal. She was kidnapped by the car's driver, 65-year-old mechanic Gheorghe Dincă, who raped and beat her. While in captivity in Dincă's house, Alexandra managed to call 112 three times, with a phone she found in the room.

Alexandra's uncle, Alexandru Cumpănașu, released a written copy of her calls on his Facebook account, to show "the rottenness of a murderous system and the courage of this incredible child". The first call took place at 11:05 a.m., 25 July. Alexandra identified herself to the operator, stated that she was kidnapped and is held in a house in Caracal. The operator asked if she was raped, and she told him she was. The operator told her they would need to know where exactly she is. During her second call at 11:06a.m., Alexandra clarified that she was kidnapped by car, she was blindfolded and locked in a room. She remembered passing a dam and guessed she might be in Bold, a district of Caracal. She did not remember the license plate but remembered that the car was grey. She stated she found the name of Lucian Gabriel Popescu on a business card in the house, but that she doesn't know whether or not that was the kidnapper's name. She also mentioned she is calling from the kidnapper's phone she also found in the room. Police took over the call at 11:07; Alexandra gave the address on the business card to the police, but when they stated it belongs to an apartment building, she said she was held in a detached house. The third call took place at 11:12a.m.; Alexandra asked if a police car is on its way, and said she is afraid of the perpetrator coming back. Police took over the call again, and clarified that she is not sure the business card belongs to the perpetrator. During all three calls the operators and the police officers spoke to her in an ironic and condescending tone, while Alexandra was begging for their help and said several times that she was scared.

The police succeeded in identifying the house at 2am the next day (26 July); despite this the police force, together with prosecutors Popescu Cristian Ovidiu, Vasilescu Liviu and Zăvoianu Cătălin Alexandru agreed upon the common decision to wait four hours before using the search warrant to enter the building, even though the law did not even require them to have one.

The police arrested Dincă, who confessed he murdered Alexandra, as well as 18-year-old Luiza Melencu, who disappeared earlier in April. An official statement from DIICOT, the agency investigating the case, announced that Alexandra's DNA was identified in “dental pieces” found in a barrel on Dincă's property, however, this result was shown to be inconclusive. Some of the teeth found in the barrel exhibited dental work that Alexandra didn't have, but the forensic specialists failed to make note of this, and examined the teeth as a whole using a destructive method that rendered individual analysis of each tooth impossible. Despite the uncertainties of the DNA result, on its basis, DIICOT issued a death certificate for Alexandra, which her family refused to recognize.

== Allegations of corruption and human trafficking ==
The families of Alexandra Măceșanu and Luiza Melencu do not believe the girls were murdered by Gheorghe Dincă. Many suspect that Dincă is lying to cover a human trafficking network, a widespread phenomenon in Romania, and that the prosecutors who worked on Alexandra's disappearance intentionally delayed the raid on Dincă's property.

Prosecutor Vasilescu Liviu, while working on the case of Luiza Melencu's disappearance, obtained footage of Dincă's car shot by a surveillance camera, linking Dincă to Luiza's disappearance well before Alexandra's kidnapping. Despite this, prosecutor Vasilescu never questioned Dincă or searched his car or property. Furthermore, in the case of Alexandra's disappearance, prosecutor Vasilescu didn't share the footage of Dincă's car with the other prosecutors until the morning of 27 July, and even then, he only showed them a still picture from the footage, where the license plate of Dincă's car happened to not be visible.

On 27 July, after the raid on Dincă's property finally took place, prosecutor Popescu Cristian Ovidiu apparently argued that not only Alexandra had been murdered at 2 a.m. that morning, but also that the cause of her death was strangulation, despite the fact that there was no body found for him to even speculate about, and this was days before Dincă's confession.

Both Alexandra and Luiza's families received phone calls from men offering reassurances about the girls shortly after each disappearance. Alexandra's mother received a series of phone calls before and after her daughter's supposed murder, at least one of them believed to have been made by Gheorghe Dincă, telling her that Alexandra is well, and that she had gotten married and ran away to work abroad. Before that, in April, Luiza's family received two similar phone calls, one believed to be from Dincă, and another from an unknown man, suggesting Dincă may have had accomplices.

Gheorghe Dincă's claim that he incinerated Alexandra has been called into question. For one, it is unclear why Dincă would not have attempted to immediately dispose of the body if he knew Alexandra had called the police using his phone, instead choosing to slowly incinerate her body whole for approx. 8 hours. Also, incineration of a whole human or animal body is expected to produce a noticeably unpleasant smell and some amount of smoke, but Dincă's neighbors gave wildly conflicting testimonies regarding whether they smelled anything unusual, and none of them saw any smoke coming from Dincă's property, to confirm if a burning really took place.

DIICOT has been criticized for investigating both Alexandra and Luiza's cases as murders, instead of kidnappings, and for refusing many of the requests made by the lawyers of the victims’ families that were seemingly relevant to the case, such as performing a judicial experiment to ascertain if Dincă could’ve incinerated the bodies of the victims as described, or to question important witnesses and suspected accomplices to Dincă's sex trafficking and other criminal activities.

Alexandra's uncle, businessman and former talk-show host Alexandru Cumpănașu, revealed that a week after his niece's kidnapping, he allegedly obtained information about her whereabouts which required immediate action from the authorities and which he sent to several officials asking for help, most notably to president Klaus Iohannis, who infamously replied: “I will analyze”. Until currently, none of the officials in question have commented publicly about Cumpănașu's plea, and it's unknown how, or if, they've acted on the information.

== Public reaction ==
The case met widespread outrage in Romania and the news of the murder and the events following it spread across Europe. On 27 July more than 2,500 people protested in Bucharest. Newly appointed Interior Minister Nicolae Moga dismissed National Police Chief Ioan Buda, Olt County Prefect Petre Neacșu and Olt County Police Chief Cristian Voiculescu before resigning himself, only a week after taking office. Minister of Education Ecaterina Andronescu has been dismissed by the Prime Minister after remarking that "young girls should know better than to get in cars with strangers". The case also highlights the fact that insufficient public transport is a serious problem in the Romanian countryside, where hitchhiking plays an important role in transportation.

Lucian Gabriel Popescu, the man first misidentified as the perpetrator, stated in a press release that he only met Dincă once, while working in the local cadastre office; he does not know him. He asked the press not to contact him, as he and his family were strongly affected by the case.

== See also ==
- List of kidnappings
- List of solved missing person cases (post-2000)
- Murder of Anda Maria Gyurca
