= CEST =

CEST or cest may refer to:

- Central European Summer Time (UTC+2), daylight saving time observed in the central European time zone
- Cognitive-Experiential Self-Theory
- Chemical Exchange Saturation Transfer, a subset of Magnetization transfer in MRI
- Cest, a woman's girdle
- Cest or Cesti, informal or plural for Cestus, an ancient battle glove
- The "Check Employment Status for Tax" online tool used for assessing contractors' employment status for IR35 purposes under UK tax law

== See also ==
- Cesta, Kočevje
