= Displacement (fencing) =

In fencing, displacement is a movement that avoids or dodges an attack.

Fencers commonly use displacement when attacking while not having priority. Attacking into the opponent's right-of-way is known as a counter-attack. If both fencers land, the fencer with priority, the attacker, is awarded the touch; therefore, the goal of the displacement is to hit the opponent while avoiding being hit in return. Displacement can take the form of retreating, advancing past the enemy's blade, utilising a flèche, ducking, or even stepping off the piste.
