= Joan Colom =

Spanish photographer (1921–2017)

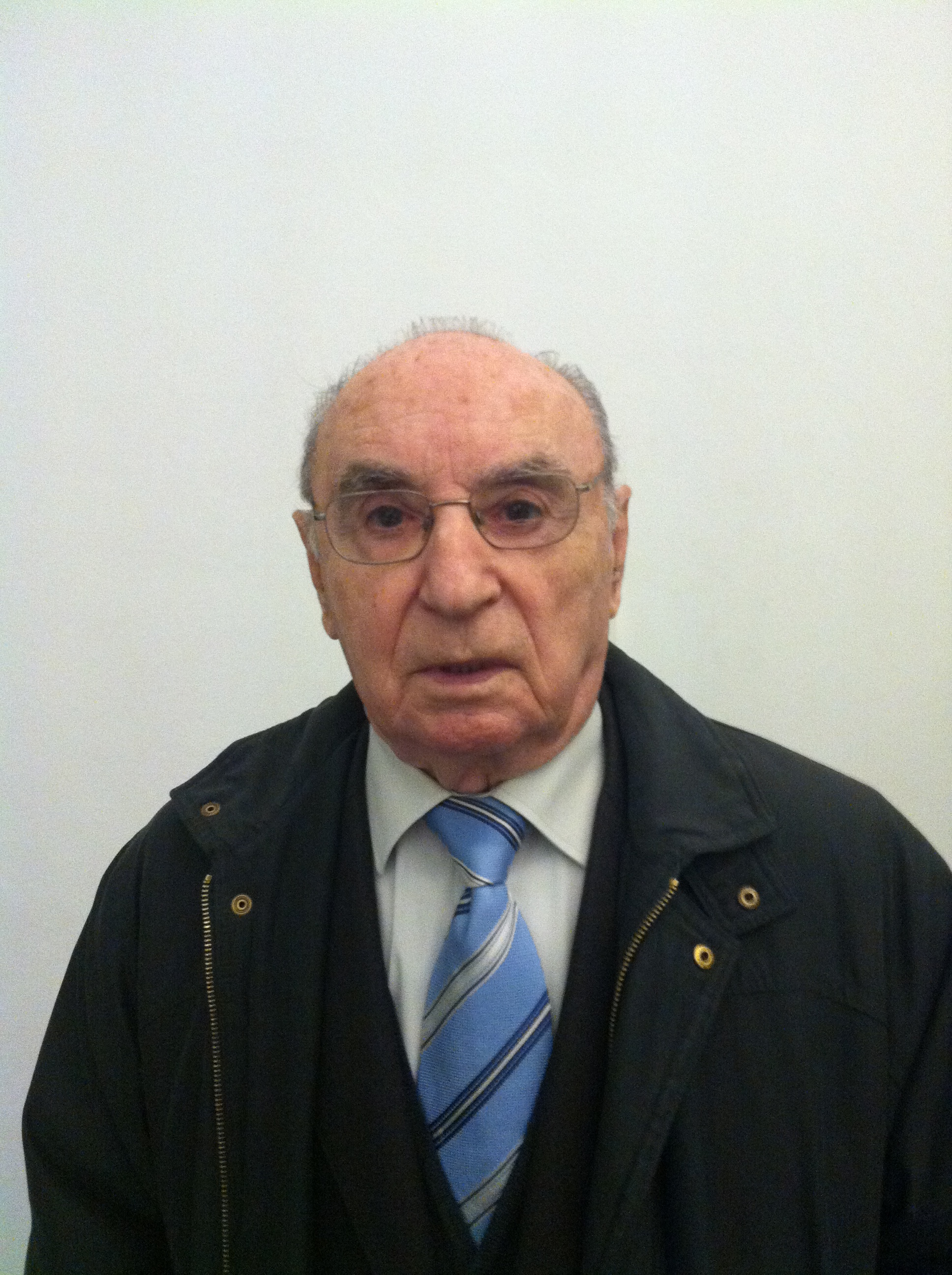
- Joan Colom at MACBA.
- Born: Barcelona
- Died: 3 September 2017 (aged 96)
- Known for: Photographer
- Movement: El Mussol
- Awards: National Photography Prize

Joan Colom i Altemir (April 1921 – 3 September 2017) was a Spanish photographer renowned for his portraits of Barcelona's underworld and working class, especially in the infamous neighbourhood of Raval.

== Biography ==
Colom was born in Barcelona. He was a self-taught photographer, and produced his best-known pictures while working during the week as an accountant.

In 1957 he became a member of the Agrupació Fotogràfica de Catalunya (AFC), and co-founded in 1960 the artist's group El Mussol ("The Owl").

In 1962 he was presented in Paris along with fellow photographers Xavier Misserachs and Oriol Maspons as part of the "New Avantgarde" movement, strongly inspired by masters such as Brassaï, Francesc Català Roca, Henri Cartier-Bresson or Man Ray.

He was awarded the National Photography Prize by Spain's Ministry of Culture in 2002, as well as the Golden Medal for Cultural Merit by the Barcelona city council, the National Visual Arts Prize by the Generalitat de Catalunya and the Creu de Sant Jordi in 2006.

In 2011 the Museu Nacional d'Art de Catalunya (MNAC) was granted by the artist part of his photographic material.
