= Carrer del Carme, Barcelona =

Street in Barcelona, Catalonia, Spain

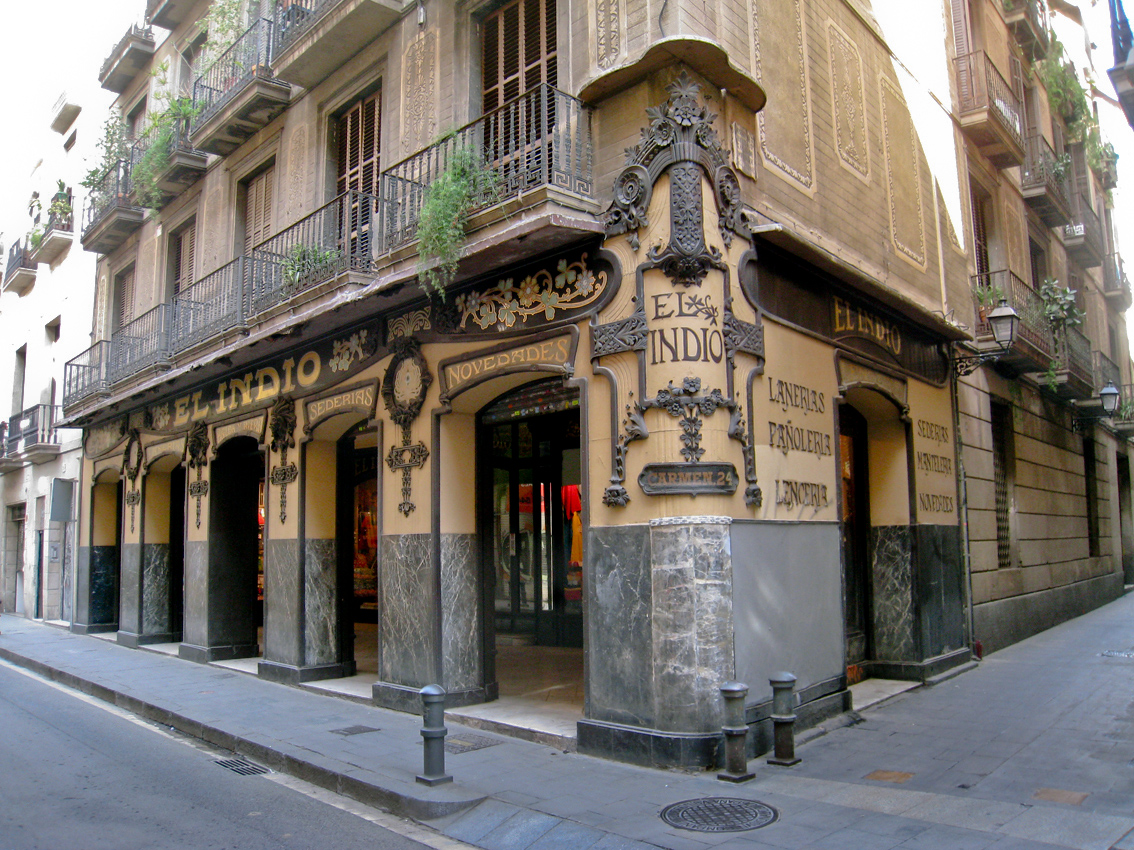
The large traditional shop El Indio in Carrer del Carme.

Carrer del Carme (official Catalan name; Spanish: Calle del Carmen) is a street in central Barcelona, Catalonia, Spain, located in the Raval neighbourhood of the Ciutat Vella district. It is part of the recently revamped commercial area of Raval. This street contains the main offices of Institut d'Estudis Catalans and Societat Catalana de Geografia, as well as the Catholic church Església de Betlem, built in the Baroque style, and the public library Biblioteca Sant Pau-Santa Creu, based in the former building of Hospital de la Santa Creu, which was moved to El Guinardó. The street is notable for being mentioned on the first page of Jean Genet's novel The Thief's Journal.

It must not be confused with Plaça del Carmén (Carmen is a common typo in online guides which often redirects to that one), in the Les Corts district, or with other streets that bear the same name in other cities.

== Transport ==
=== Metro ===
- Liceu metro station, served by L3, on La Rambla right next to Carrer del Carme.
- Sant Antoni metro station, served by L2. On Ronda Sant Antoni, not far from the street.

== See also ==
- Carrer del Carme in Cambrils
- Carrer del Carme in Girona
- Carrer del Carme in Lleida
- Barri del Carme in Reus
- Urban planning of Barcelona
