= Missing children =

Children who have disappeared

Missing children are "children whose whereabouts cannot be established and where the circumstances are out of character, or the context suggests the child may be subject of crime or at risk of harm to themselves or another". A child can be separated from parents or custodian either accidentally, when they run away, or when they are abducted, abandoned, injured, trapped or deceased.

In contrast to the plight of missing persons in general whose primary vulnerability is the lack of support from their close social groups, the vulnerability of a missing child is at once social, biological and cognitive. A child gone missing is an emergency as their tender age predisposes them to unexpected and serious harm. The plight of parents who have missed a child is often among the most agonising of the human conditions, as they do not know whether the child is safe or unsafe, dead or alive.

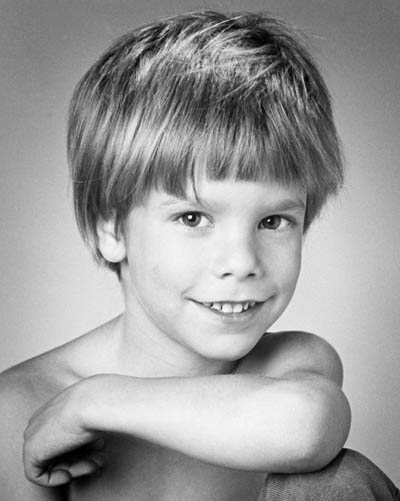
Photo of six year old Etan Patz, a missing child from Lower Manhattan who never came back and whose tragedy triggered a slew of major governmental efforts in the United States to trace missing children

Instances of missing children are among the most evocative issues in society and the cases have attracted much attention in media as well as popular culture. The failure of agencies to rescue missing children in time has often witnessed massive reprisals from people, and this has precipitated grave political situations such as what followed the Kidnapping of Alexandra Măceșanu and Luiza Melencu when the death of the child led to massive public protest and extracted a heavy political toll on the government. In the United States, the disappearance of Etan Patz led to a series decisions at the national level including the declaration of the National Missing Children's Day. Nobel Committee underlined the importance of addressing the issue of missing children when it awarded Nobel Peace Prize to Kailash Satyarthi.

== Causes ==
Children are classified as missing when it is unclear to their parents or guardians where they are for an extended period of time, though missing children also includes those who have been abducted by their parents or relatives outside of lawful agreements. Causes include cases when a child is injured, kidnapped, trapped, deceased, has run away, or getting accidentally lost as in a busy marketplace.

== Consequences ==
Most children reported missing are located quickly. Missing children enjoy massive goodwill from society and generally receive care and sympathy of the general public and more people come forward to help them than harm them. However, as long they remain missing, their tender age, lack of physical strength, social skills and cognitive development predispose them to harm from accidents, criminals, and criminal tendencies. This can lead to situations where they suffer injuries, violence, recruitment into criminal gangs, child labour, slavery, and, in rare cases, death.

== Rescue ==
The time at which a child should be considered missing is defined as the time when the parents or custodians report the child to be missing. Any delay in launching a rescue can be fatal for the child; in fact the initial hours are the most productive hours for rescue. The following strategies have been adopted or proposed to be adopted in rescue of missing children.

- Public alerts (such as the Amber Alert that was introduced in the United States and later adopted in countries from Canada to UK to Slovakia to China to Australia) and crowdsourcing.
- Police Investigation: Early intervention, community involvement, examination of child's parents, friends and teachers, inter-agency coordination, especially with railway police, border police, transport agencies etc. are some of the strategies adopted by Police. Standard Operating Procedures exist in many jurisdictions
- Rescue during crowd gathering: Children getting separated from parents during mass gatherings is a common challenge encountered by Police. Radio Frequency wrist bands, intelligent video surveillance systems etc. have been employed to prevent and locate missing children during such gatherings:
- Databank for missing children and found children.
- Legal provisions for mandatory reporting of found children: Many jurisdictions have punitive provisions incorporated into statutes(eg: Juvenile Justice -Care and Protection of Children- Act, 2015, India) for not reporting details of found children to designated systems.
- Rescue Drives.
- DNA matching: This can be employed in specific suspected cases or as part of mass detection drive where DNA bank of parents of missing children can be matched against DNA bank of found children.
- Deep Learning-Enabled Missing Child Identification

== Notable cases ==
- Disappearance of the Beaumont children (Australia)
- Disappearance of Sheila Fox (United Kingdom)
- Disappearance of Etan Patz (United States)
- Disappearance of Ludovic Janvier (France)
- Death of Baby Falak (India)
- Kidnapping of Alexandra Măceșanu and Luiza Melencu (Romania)
- Murder of Adam Walsh (United States)
- 2006 Noida serial murders (India)
- Disappearance of Madeleine McCann (United Kingdom)
- Murder of Cecilia Zhang (Canada)
- Guaratuba case (Brazil)
- Abduction of Insiya Hemani (India/Netherlands)

== Prevention strategies ==
As the reasons for missing children vary across geographies, understanding the characteristics of children who go missing on a regular basis is an important first step in developing prevention strategies. The studies so far indicate increased propensity for certain categories of children to go missing. This includes children with parents facing mental health challenges, children facing parental conflict, and children who are victims of various kinds of abuse. Hence prevention programs to identify, screen, and engage these high-risk children and their families can be productive.

== See also ==
- Missing person
- Child abduction
