= Les Planes (Barcelona–Vallès Line) =

Railway station in Barcelona, Spain

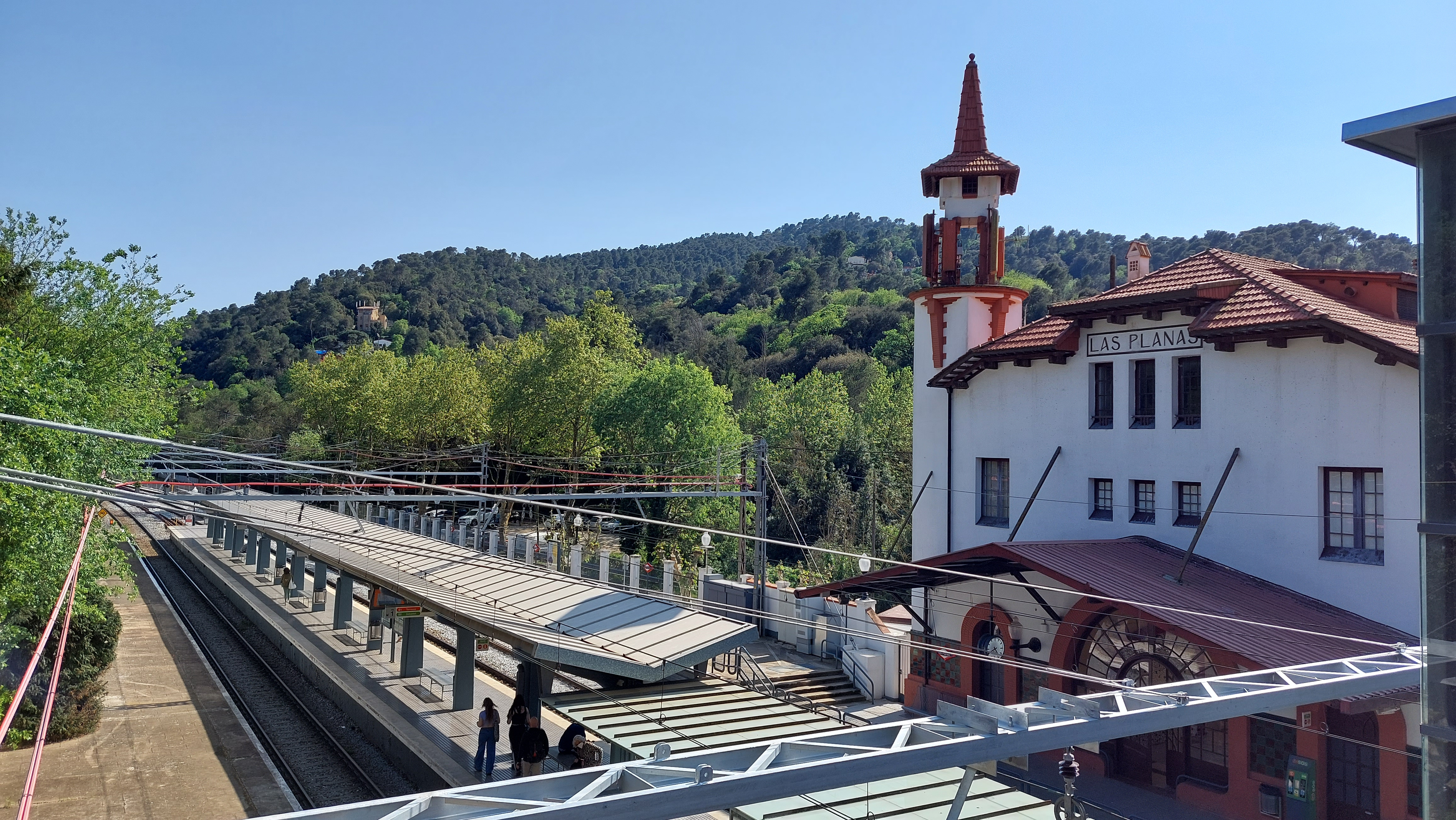
- Platforms and station building

General information
- Location: Barcelona
- Coordinates: 41°25′38.63″N 2°05′29.40″E
- System: Metro del Vallès commuter rail station
- Owner: Ferrocarrils de la Generalitat de Catalunya
- Platforms: 4
- Tracks: 3

Construction
- Structure type: Above ground

Other information
- Fare zone: 1 (ATM)

History
- Opened: 1916

Passengers
- 2018: 395,050

Services
Preceding station	FGC	Following station
Baixador de Vallvidrera towards Barcelona Pl. Catalunya	S1	La Floresta towards Terrassa Nacions Unides
Baixador de Vallvidrera towards Barcelona Pl. Catalunya	S2	La Floresta towards Sabadell Parc del Nord
Location

Les Planes (Catalan pronunciation: [ləs ˈplanəs]) is a railway station in Les Planes, in the Serra de Collserola hills, part of the Sarrià-Sant Gervasi district of Barcelona. It is served by lines S1 and S2 of the Metro del Vallès commuter rail system, which are operated by Ferrocarrils de la Generalitat de Catalunya, who also run the station.

The station has three tracks, although the track nearest the station building is a terminal track only accessible from the south. The tracks are served by four platform faces, but only those of the island platform between the through tracks are in normal use. This platform is accessed by footbridge, stairs, and lifts.

The station building is the only example of a railway station in Catalonia executed in the modernista or Art Nouveau style. It opened in 1916 as the northern terminus of the first section of the line from Peu del Funicular station to the Vallès.

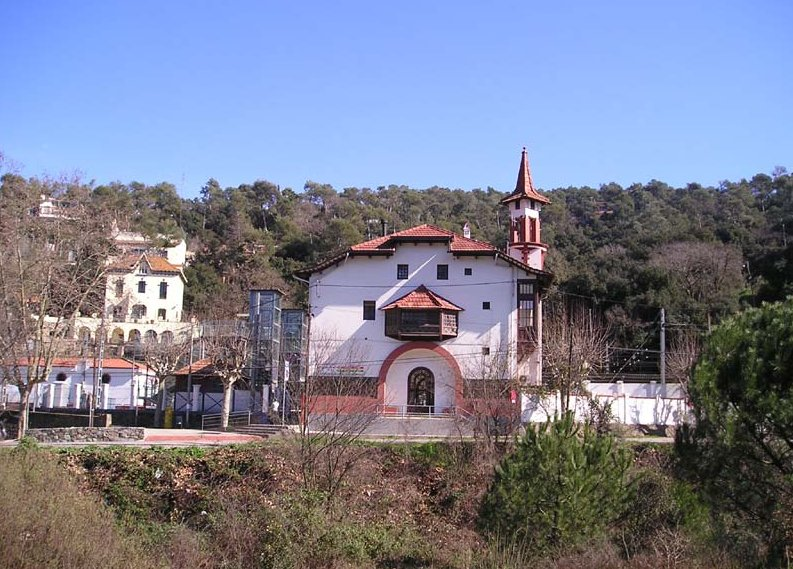
Les Planes railway station from outside

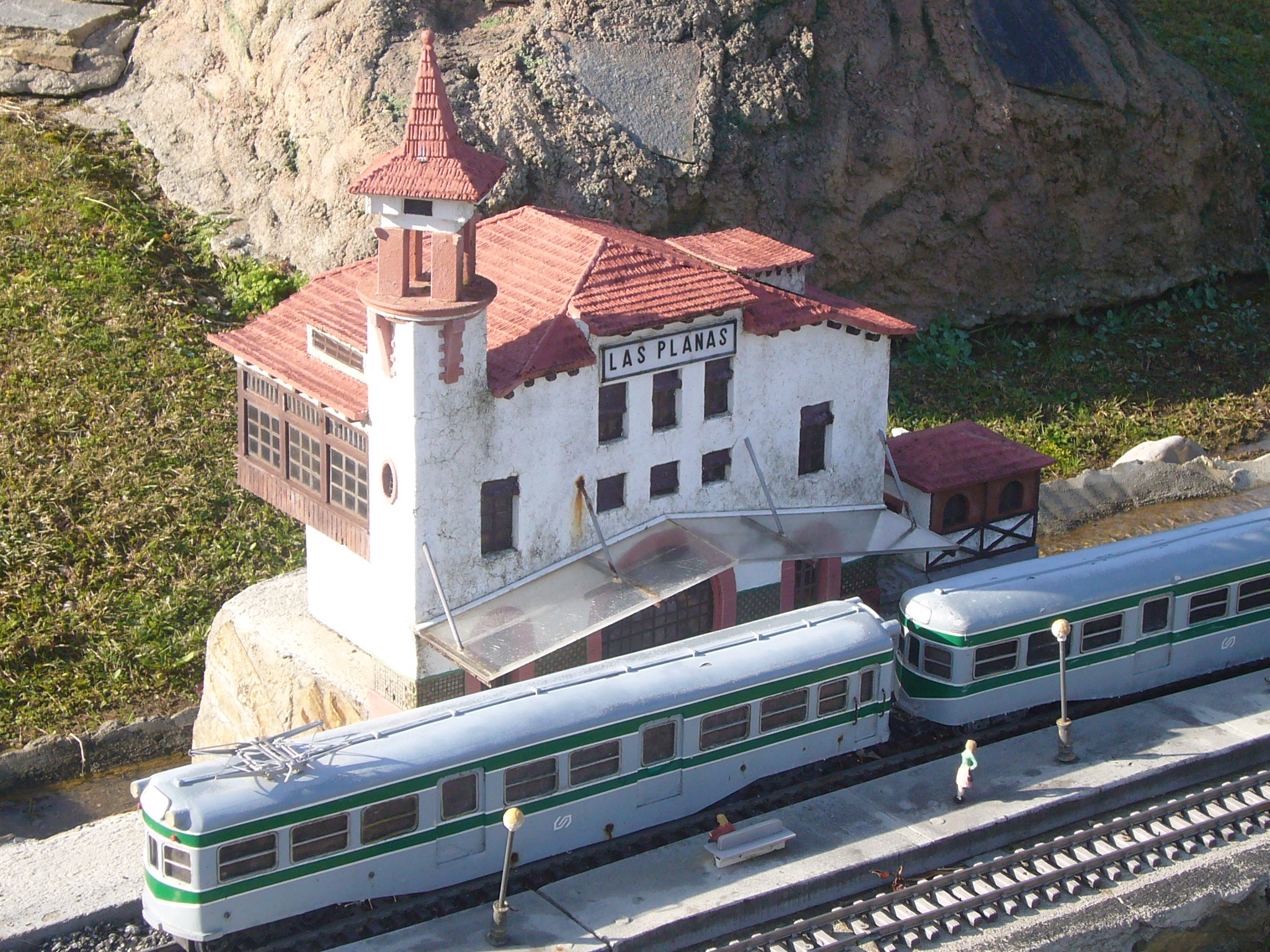
Scale model of the station at Catalunya en Miniatura

== See also ==
- List of railway stations in Barcelona
- List of Modernisme buildings in Barcelona
