= Columbus Monument, Barcelona =

Monument in Barcelona

Coordinates: 41°22′32.89″N 2°10′39.94″E

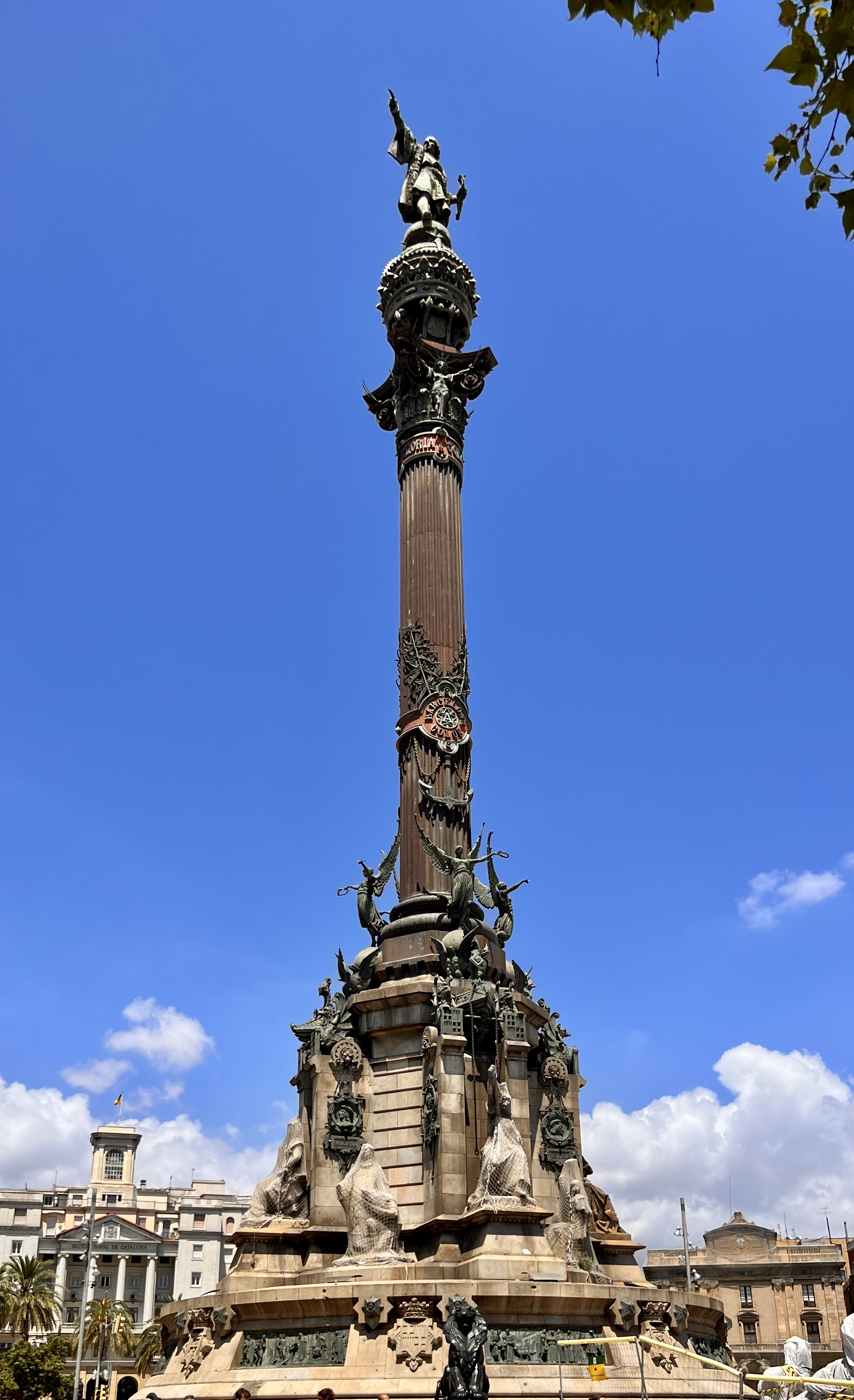
Columbus Monument, Barcelona

The Columbus Monument (Catalan: Monument a Colom, IPA: [munuˈment ə kuˈlom]; Spanish: Monumento a Colón or Mirador de Colón) is a 60 m (197 ft) tall monument to Christopher Columbus at the lower end of La Rambla, Barcelona, Catalonia, Spain. It was constructed for the Exposición Universal de Barcelona (1888) in honor of Columbus' first voyage to the Americas. The monument serves as a reminder that Christopher Columbus reported to Queen Isabella I and King Ferdinand V in Barcelona after his first trip to the new continent.

== Description ==
=== Statue and column ===
At the very top of the monument stands a 7.2 m (24 ft) tall bronze statue atop a 40 m (131 ft) tall Corinthian column. The statue was sculpted by Rafael Atché and is said to depict Columbus pointing towards the New World with his right hand, while holding a scroll in the left. The statue points south-southeast (a more southerly direction than the adjacent Rambla Del Mar and almost a perfect extension of the direction of La Rambla, Barcelona) and in effect is pointing at a point somewhere near the city of Constantine, Algeria. To point at Genoa in northern Italy the statue would have to face east-northeast and point up the coastline. It is more likely that the statue is situated in the current way simply to have Columbus point out to sea underscoring his achievements in naval exploration. The statue is atop a socle, on which the word "Tierra" (land) is inscribed.

=== Pedestal ===
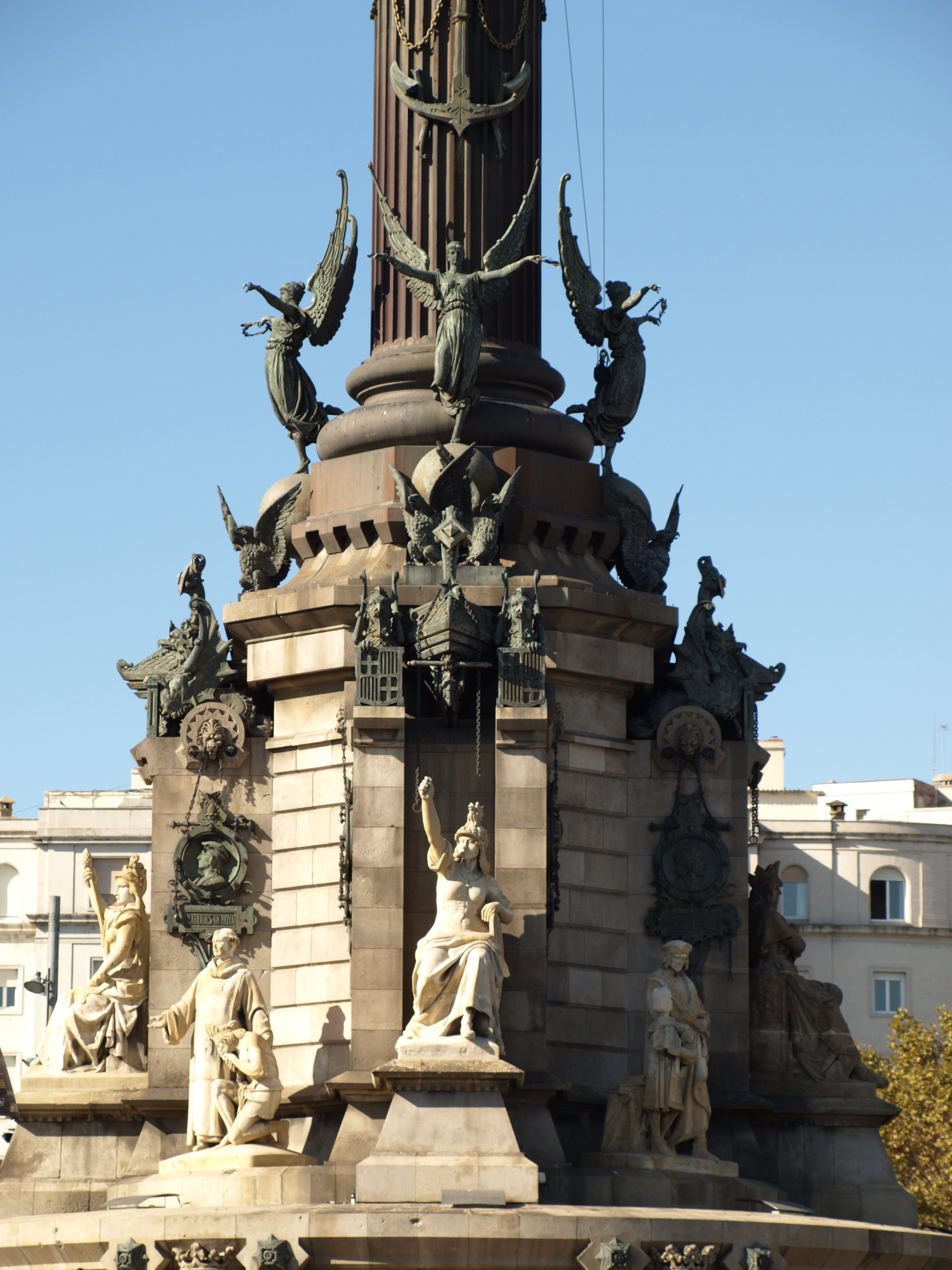
Pedestal of Columbus Monument

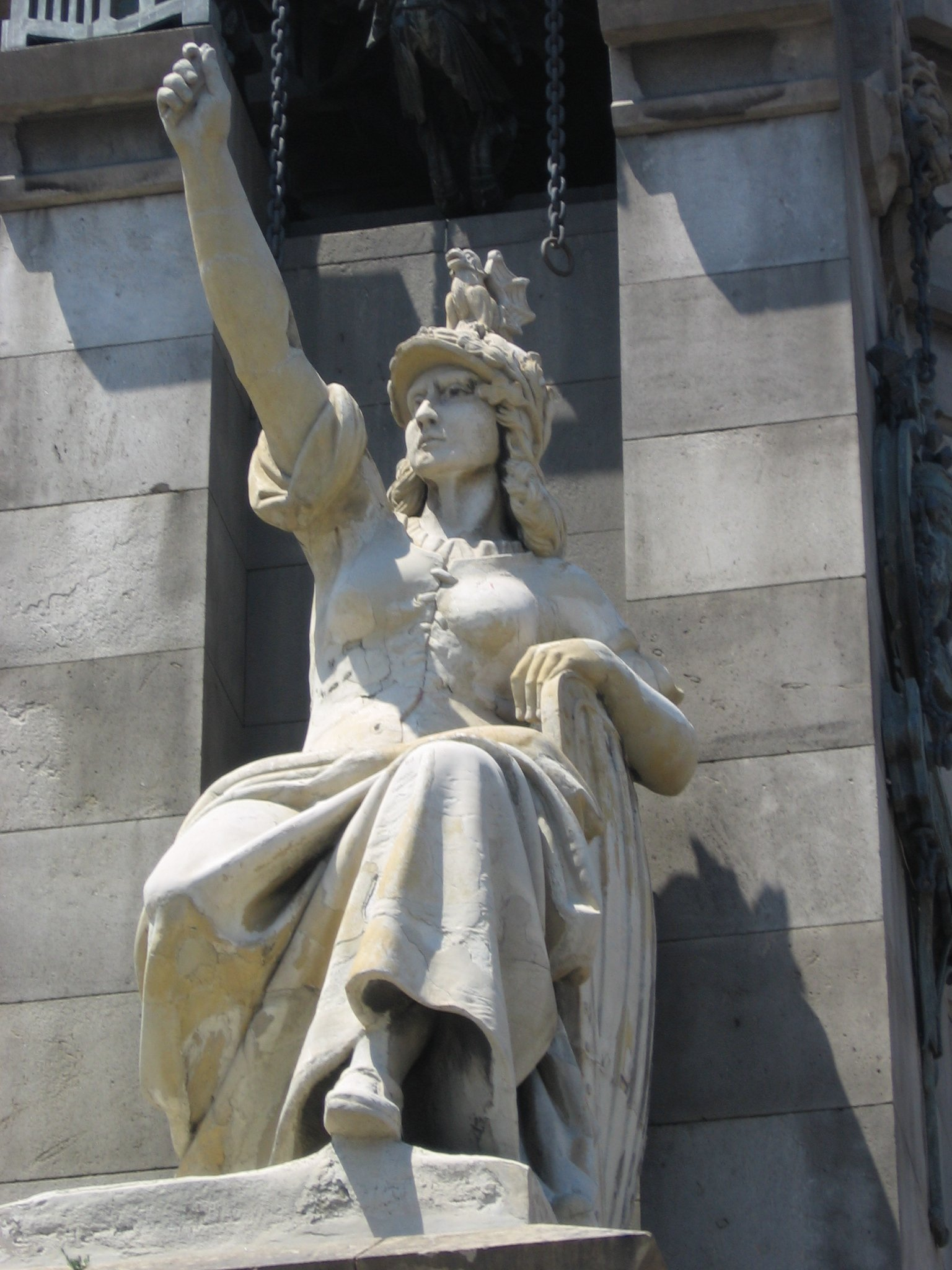
Alegoría de Cataluña at the base of the monument

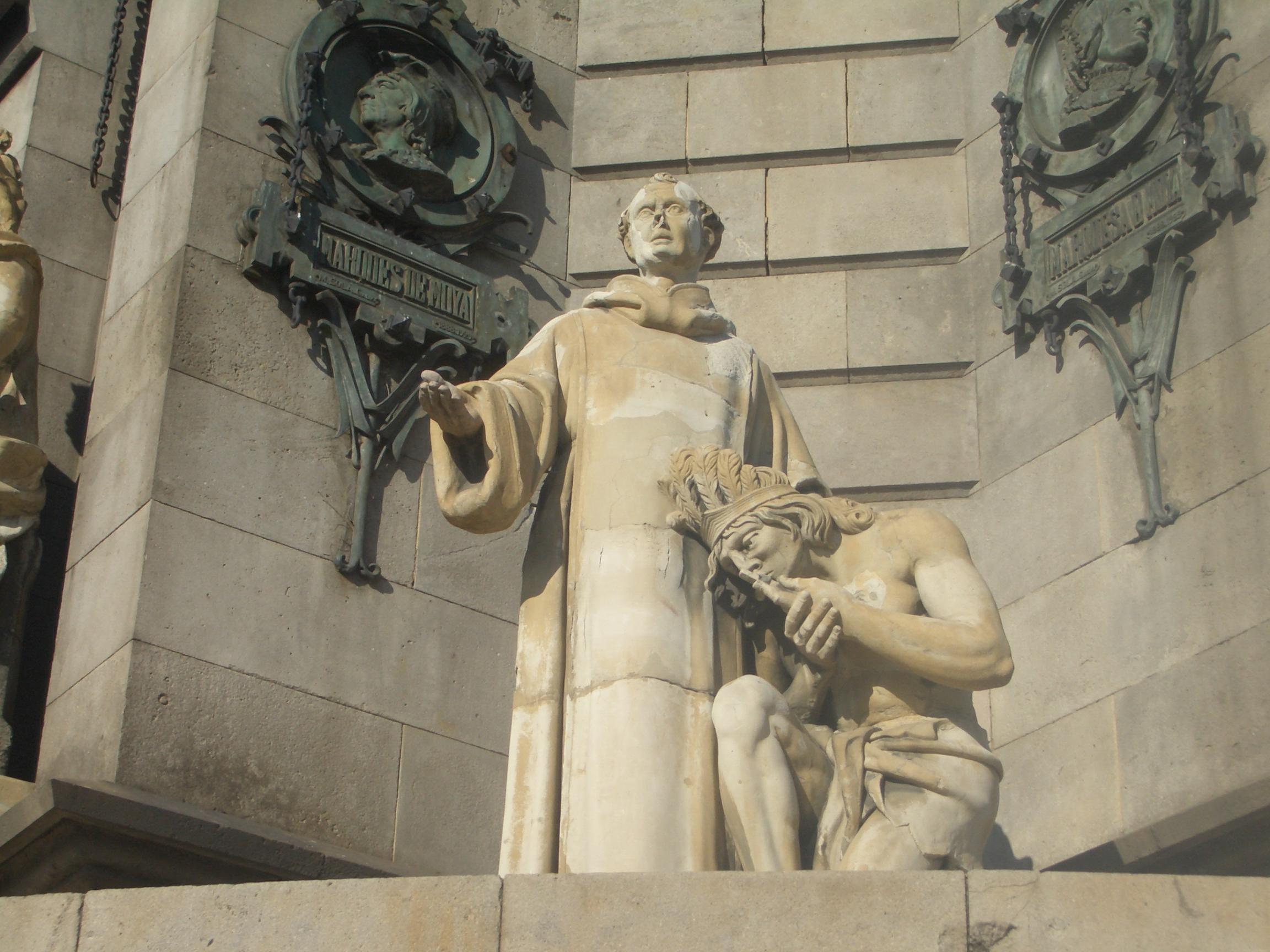
Statue of Father Bernat de Boïl, with the medallions of the Marqués and Marquessa de Moya behind

The column, hung with a device bearing an anchor, stands on an octagonal pedestal from which four bronze winged victories or Phemes take flight towards the four corners of the world, above paired griffins. Four buttresses against the octagonal pedestal bear portrait medallions that depict persons related to Columbus:

1. Martín Alonzo Pinzón
2. Vicente Yáñez Pinzón
3. Ferdinand II of Aragon
4. Isabella I of Castile
5. Father Juan Pérez
6. Father Antonio de Marchena
7. Andrés de Cabrera, Marqués de Moya
8. Beatriz Fernández de Bobadilla, Marquessa de Moya

Seated against the buttresses are four figures that represent four realms of Spain: the Principality of Catalonia, and the kingdoms of León, Aragon, and Castile.

Against the base of the pedestal between the buttresses are four additional statues:

1. Jaume Ferrer, a Mallorcan cartographer
2. Luis de Santángel Bessant
3. Captain Pedro Bertran i de Margarit, next to a kneeling Native American.
4. Father Bernat de Boïl, preaching to a kneeling Native American.

An elevator inside the column takes visitors up to a viewing platform at the top (just below the socle).

=== Plinth ===
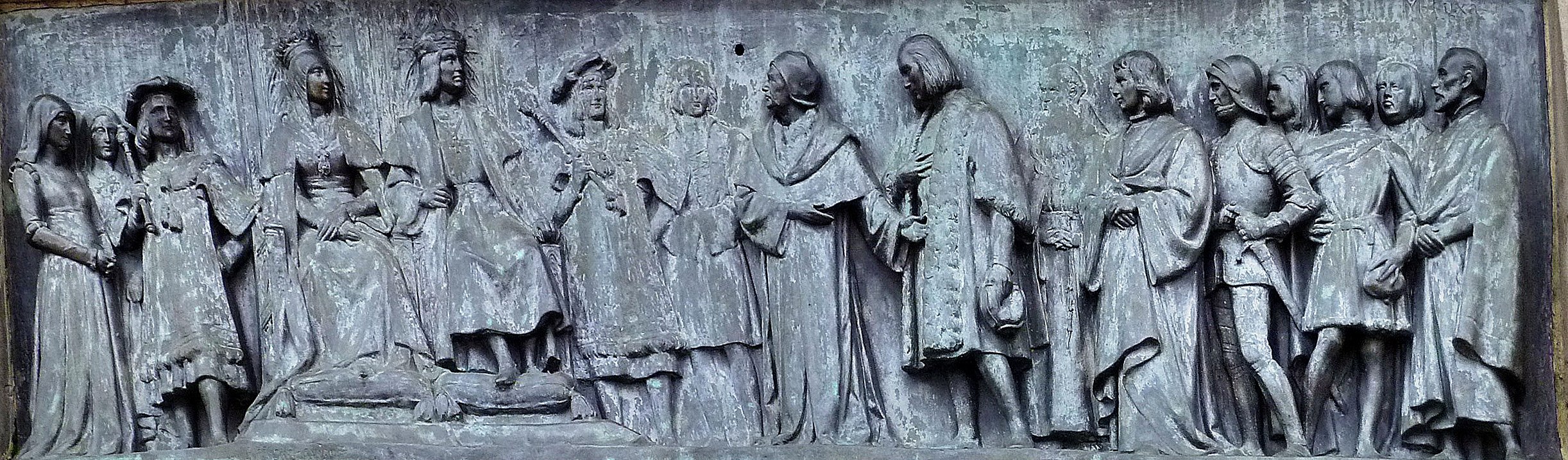
Bas-relief depicting Columbus meeting King Ferdinand and Queen Isabella in Cordoba

The canted octagonal plinth is inset with eight bronze bas-relief panels that depict important scenes in Columbus's first voyage to the Americas:

1. Columbus and his son asking for food at the La Rabida Monastery
2. Columbus explaining his plans to the monks of the La Rabida Monastery
3. Columbus meeting King Ferdinand and Queen Isabella in Córdoba
4. Columbus appearing at the council gathering in the Monastery of San Esteban in Salamanca
5. Columbus meeting the King and Queen in Santa Fe
6. Columbus leaving port from Palos de la Frontera on 3 August 1492
7. Columbus's arrival in the New World
8. Columbus greeting the King and Queen after his return in Barcelona

Alternating with the bas-reliefs are eight coats-of-arms representing locations that Columbus visited:

1. Huelva
2. Córdoba
3. Salamanca
4. Santa Fe
5. Moguer
6. Puerto Rico
7. Cuba
8. Barcelona

=== Base ===
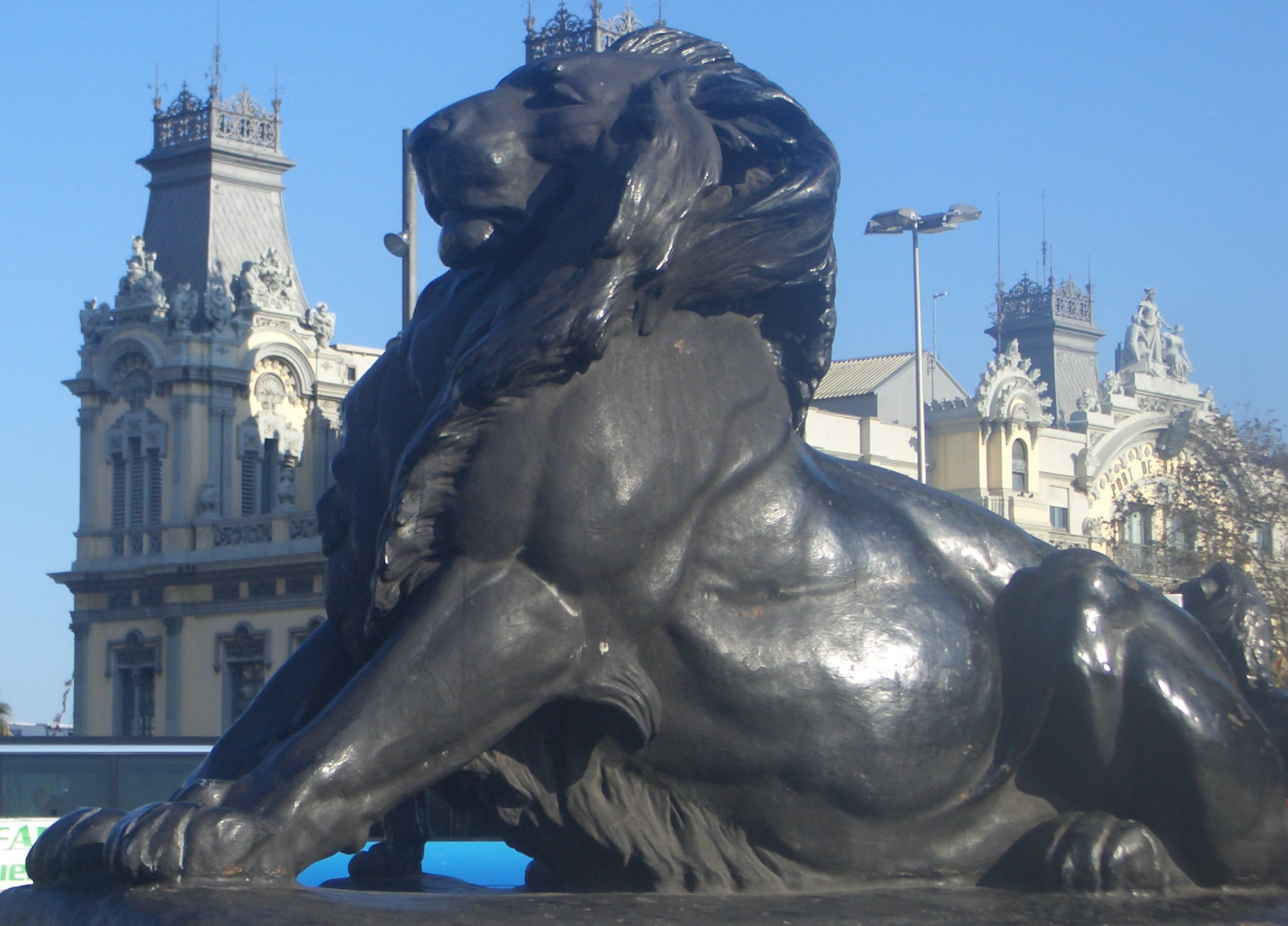
Lion at the base

The base of the monument is a 20 m (66 ft) wide circle, with four staircases. Each staircase is flanked by two lions.

== Construction ==
The idea of a monument to Columbus came in 1856 from Antoni Fages i Ferrer, who proposed that it be constructed entirely by Catalans, but he got nowhere with his plan for sixteen years. Finally in 1872 he gained the support of the mayor of the city, Francesc Rius i Taulet, and in 1881 the city passed a resolution to build the monument. A contest was held exclusively for Spanish artists to submit their designs with the winner being Gaietà Buigas i Monravà, a Catalan. Most of the money was privately raised; only twelve percent of it was financed by public funds. All of the funding came from Spanish sources and the entire construction (labour and materials) was done by Catalans. Construction began in 1882 and was completed in 1888 in time for the Exposición Universal de Barcelona.

The Honeymoon Miralda Project, launched in 1986, consisted in preparing a wedding between New York's Statue of Liberty and Barcelona's Columbus Monument, which happened in Las Vegas in 1992.

== Removal controversy ==
In 2020, there were calls to take down the statue. 250 people took to the streets on June 14, 2020, to protest in favor of removing the statue, with no damage or vandalism taking place. These calls were rejected by the city's mayor, Ada Colau. The pro-Catalan independence party Candidatura d'Unitat Popular (CUP) has been unsuccessful in attempts to get the statue removed in 2016, 2018, and 2020.

== Other versions ==
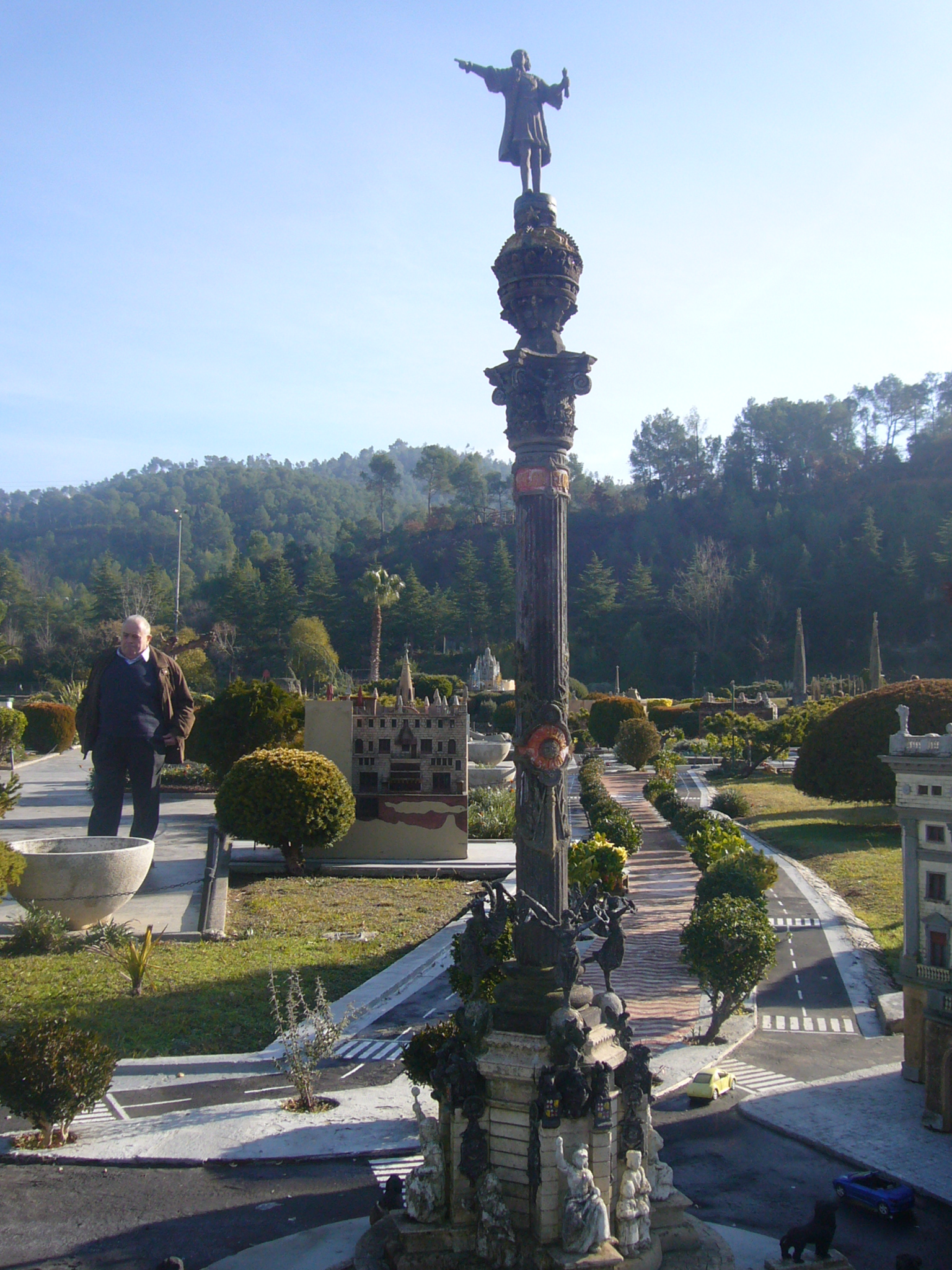
Scale model at the Catalunya en Miniatura park

Copies of the monument are located in L'Arboç (Tarragona, Spain; statue only), Shima Spanish Village (Shima, Mie, Japan), Maspalomas (Gran Canaria, Spain), and miniature versions at the Catalunya en Miniatura park (Torrelles de Llobregat, Spain) and at the Mini-Europe park (Brussels, Belgium).

== See also ==
- List of monuments and memorials to Christopher Columbus
