= La Floresta (Barcelona–Vallès Line) =

Railway station in Catalonia, Spain

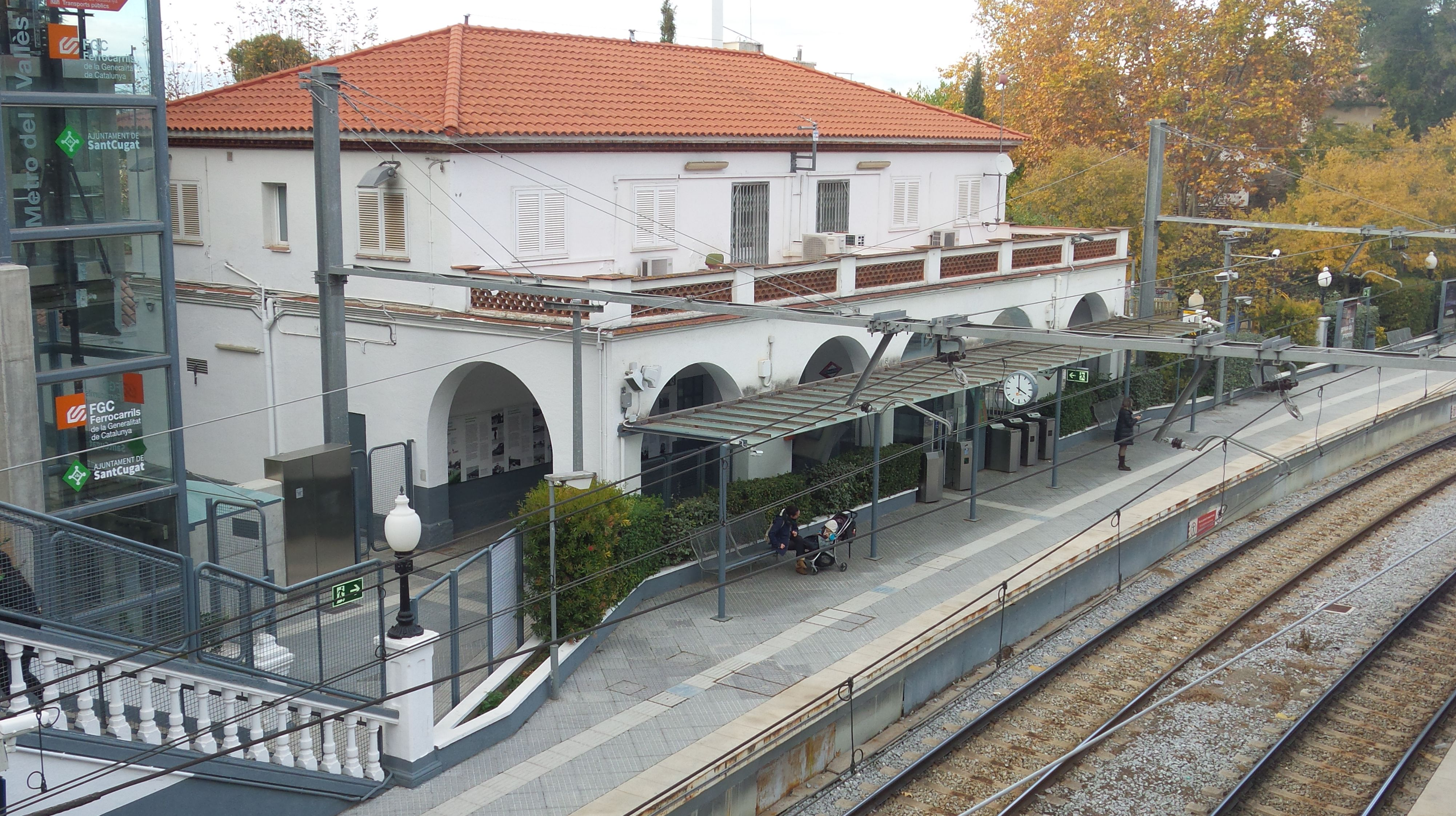

General information
- Location: Passeig de la Floresta, Sant Cugat del Vallès, Catalonia, Spain
- Coordinates: 41°26′41″N 2°04′23″E
- System: commuter
- Owner: Ferrocarrils de la Generalitat de Catalunya (FGC)
- Platforms: 2
- Tracks: 2

Construction
- Structure type: Above ground

Other information
- Station code: 618
- Fare zone: 2C

History
- Opened: 1925

Passengers
- 2018: 448,494

Services
Preceding station	FGC	Following station
Les Planes towards Barcelona Pl. Catalunya	S1	Valldoreix towards Terrassa Nacions Unides
Les Planes towards Barcelona Pl. Catalunya	S2	Valldoreix towards Sabadell Parc del Nord
Sarrià towards Barcelona Pl. Catalunya	S5	Valldoreix towards Sant Cugat
Sarrià towards Barcelona Pl. Catalunya	S6	Valldoreix towards Autonomous University
Sarrià towards Barcelona Pl. Catalunya	S7	Valldoreix towards Rubí
Location
- Location within Catalonia Location within Spain

La Floresta (Catalan pronunciation: [lə fluˈɾestə]) is a railway station in Sant Cugat del Vallès in the province of Barcelona, Catalonia, Spain. It is served by lines S1, S2, S5, S6, and S7 of the Metro del Vallès commuter rail system, which are operated by Ferrocarrils de la Generalitat de Catalunya, who also run the station.

The station has twin tracks, with two side platforms. It is in fare zone 2C of the Autoritat del Transport Metropolità fare system.

Although the line through La Floresta opened in 1917, linking Les Planes with Sant Cugat del Vallès, the station itself did not open until 1925.
