= Valldoreix (Barcelona–Vallès Line) =

Railway station in Catalonia, Spain

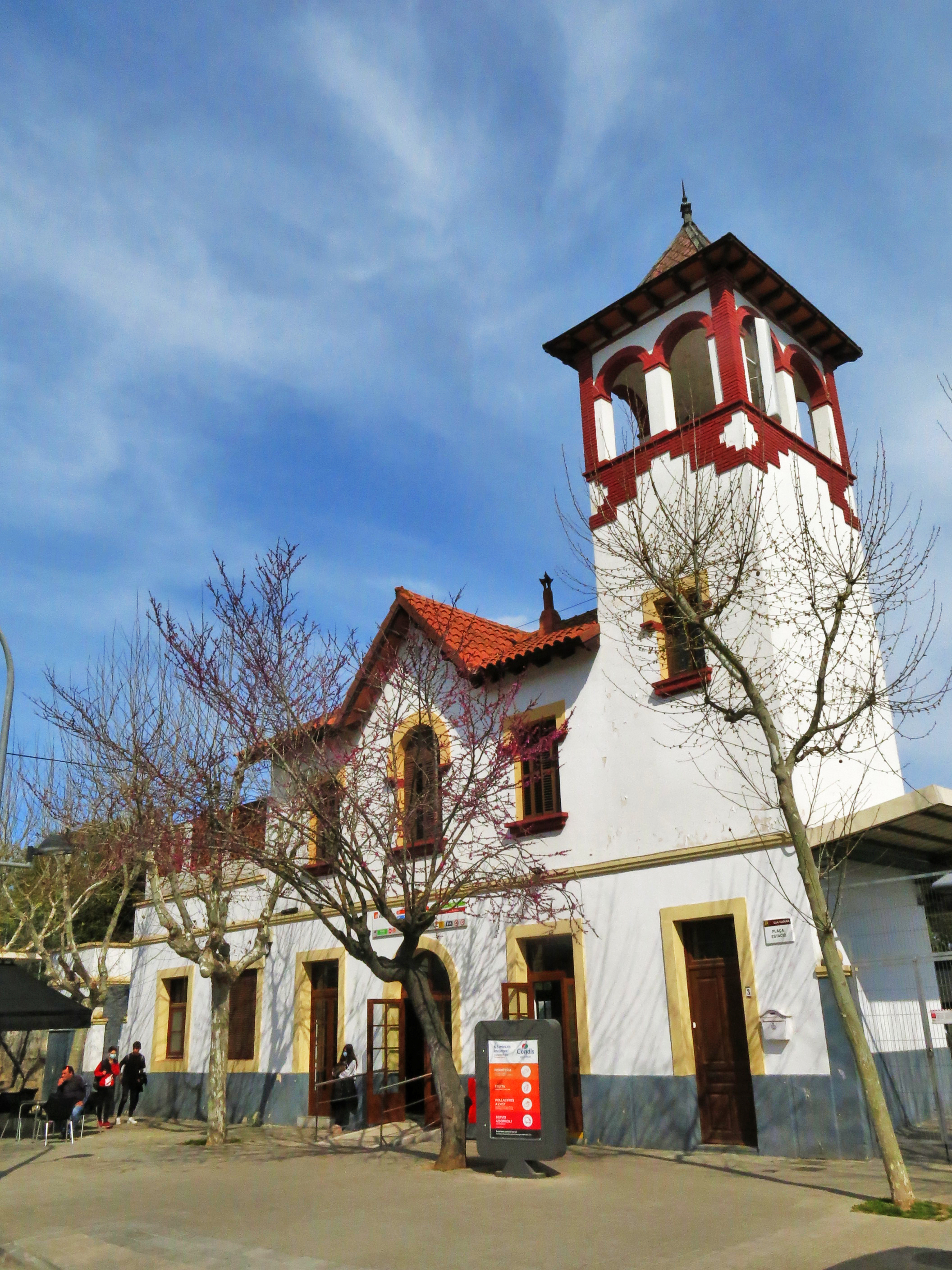
- Station building

General information
- Location: Plaça de l'Estació, Sant Cugat del Vallès, Catalonia, Spain
- Coordinates: 41°27′29″N 2°04′06″E
- System: commuter station
- Owner: FGC
- Platforms: 2
- Tracks: 2

Other information
- Station code: 619
- Fare zone: 2C

History
- Opened: 1931

Passengers
- 2018: 1,172,227

Services
Preceding station	FGC	Following station
La Floresta towards Barcelona Pl. Catalunya	S1	Sant Cugat towards Terrassa Nacions Unides
La Floresta towards Barcelona Pl. Catalunya	S2	Sant Cugat towards Sabadell Parc del Nord
La Floresta towards Barcelona Pl. Catalunya	S5	Sant Cugat Terminus
La Floresta towards Barcelona Pl. Catalunya	S6	Sant Cugat towards Autonomous University
La Floresta towards Barcelona Pl. Catalunya	S7	Sant Cugat towards Rubí
Location
- Location within Catalonia Location within Spain

Valldoreix (Catalan pronunciation: [ˌbaʎduˈɾeʃ]) is a railway station in Sant Cugat del Vallès in the province of Barcelona, Catalonia, Spain. It is served by lines S1, S2, S5, S6 and S7 of the Metro del Vallès commuter rail system, which are operated by Ferrocarrils de la Generalitat de Catalunya, who also run the station.

The station is on a curve, with twin tracks, with two side platforms. It is in fare zone 2C of the Autoritat del Transport Metropolità fare system.

Although the line through Valldoreix opened in 1917, linking Les Planes with Sant Cugat del Vallès, the station did not open until 1931.

== Gallery ==
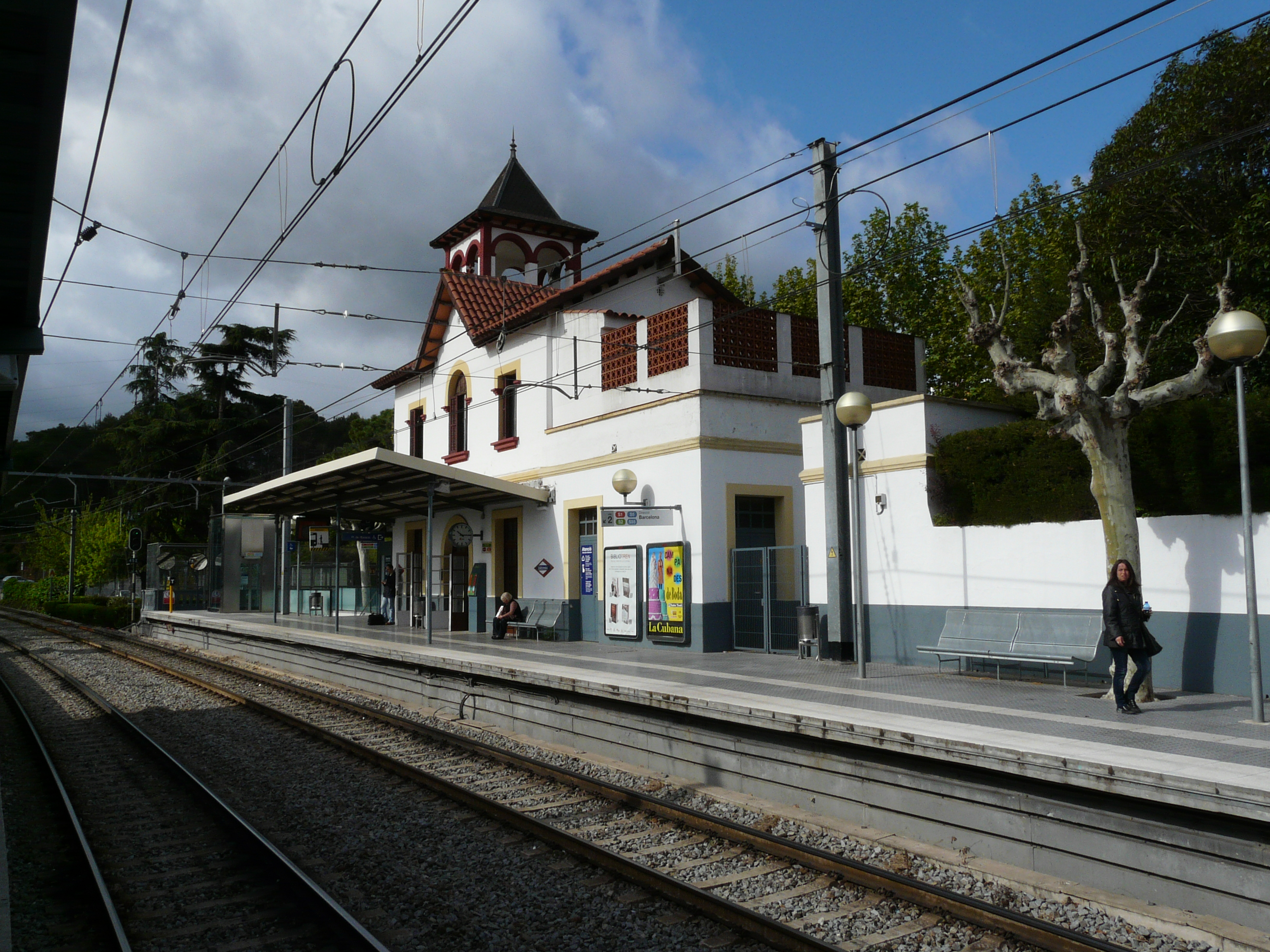
The station platforms

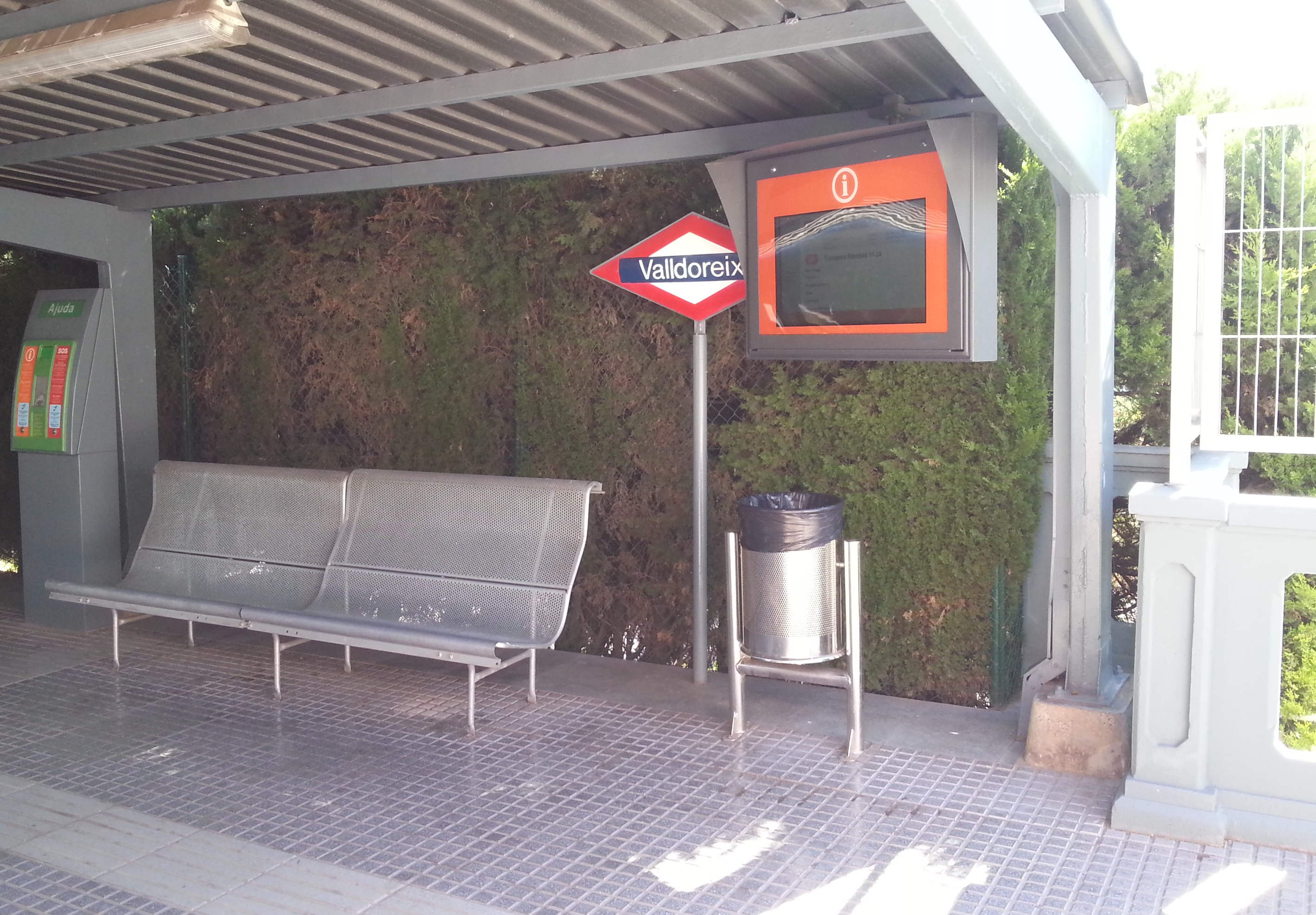
Valldoreix station
