= Catalunya en Miniatura =

Miniature park in Catalonia, Spain

Coordinates: 41°21′32″N 1°59′9″E

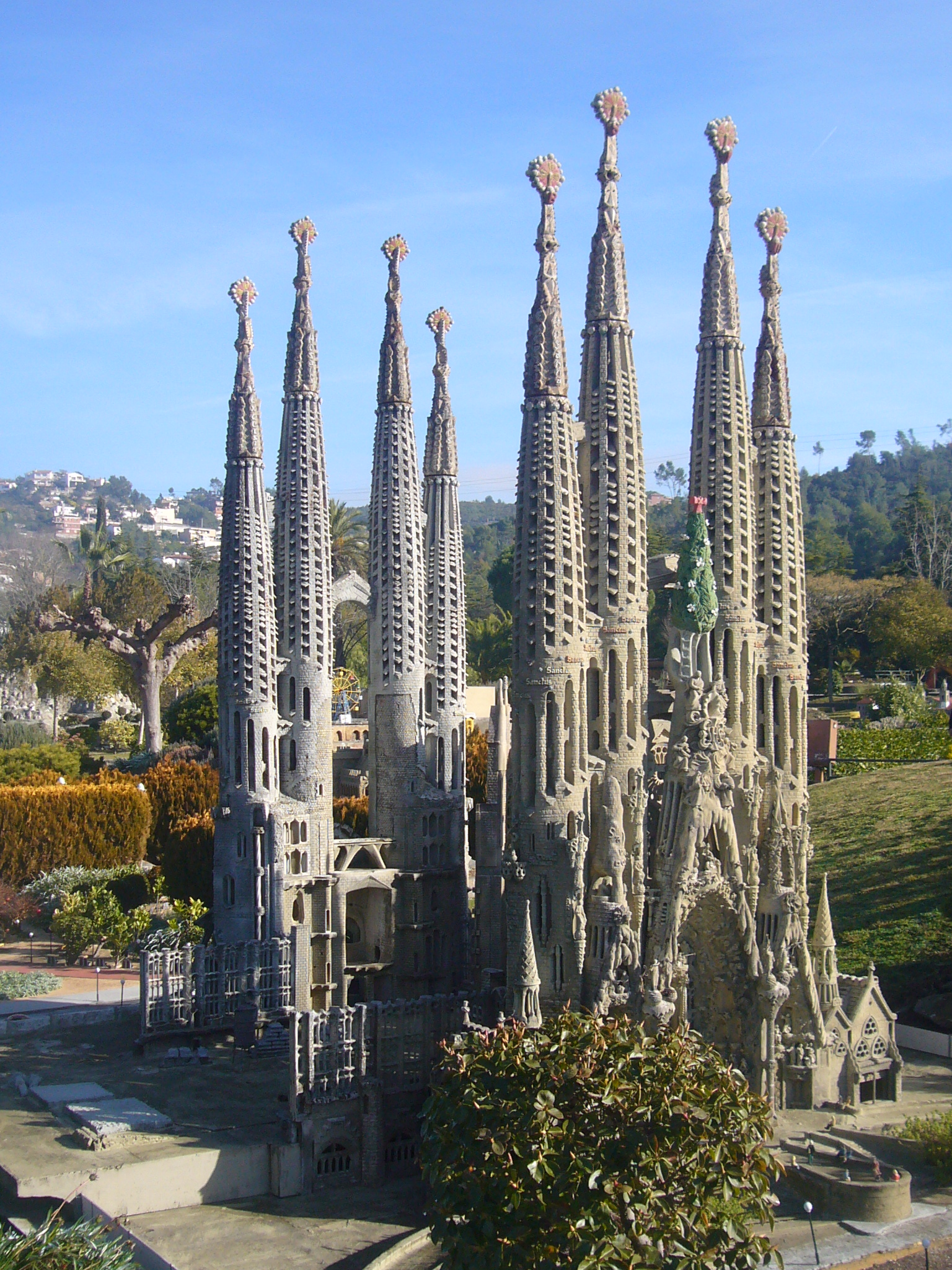
Model of the Sagrada Família church at Catalunya en Miniatura

Catalunya en Miniatura (Catalan pronunciation: [kətəˈluɲə əm mini.əˈtuɾə], in English "Catalonia in miniature") is a miniature park inaugurated in 1983 in Torrelles de Llobregat, 17 km (11 mi) from Barcelona. The park is 60,000 m^{2} (650,000 sq ft), 35,000 m^{2} (380,000 sq ft) of them devoted to the scale models, it is one of the largest miniature parks in the world, and the largest of the 14 miniature building exhibitions present in Europe. It displays 147 models of palaces, churches, bridges and other buildings from Catalonia and Mallorca and it includes all the major works by the renowned architect Antoni Gaudí.

== History ==
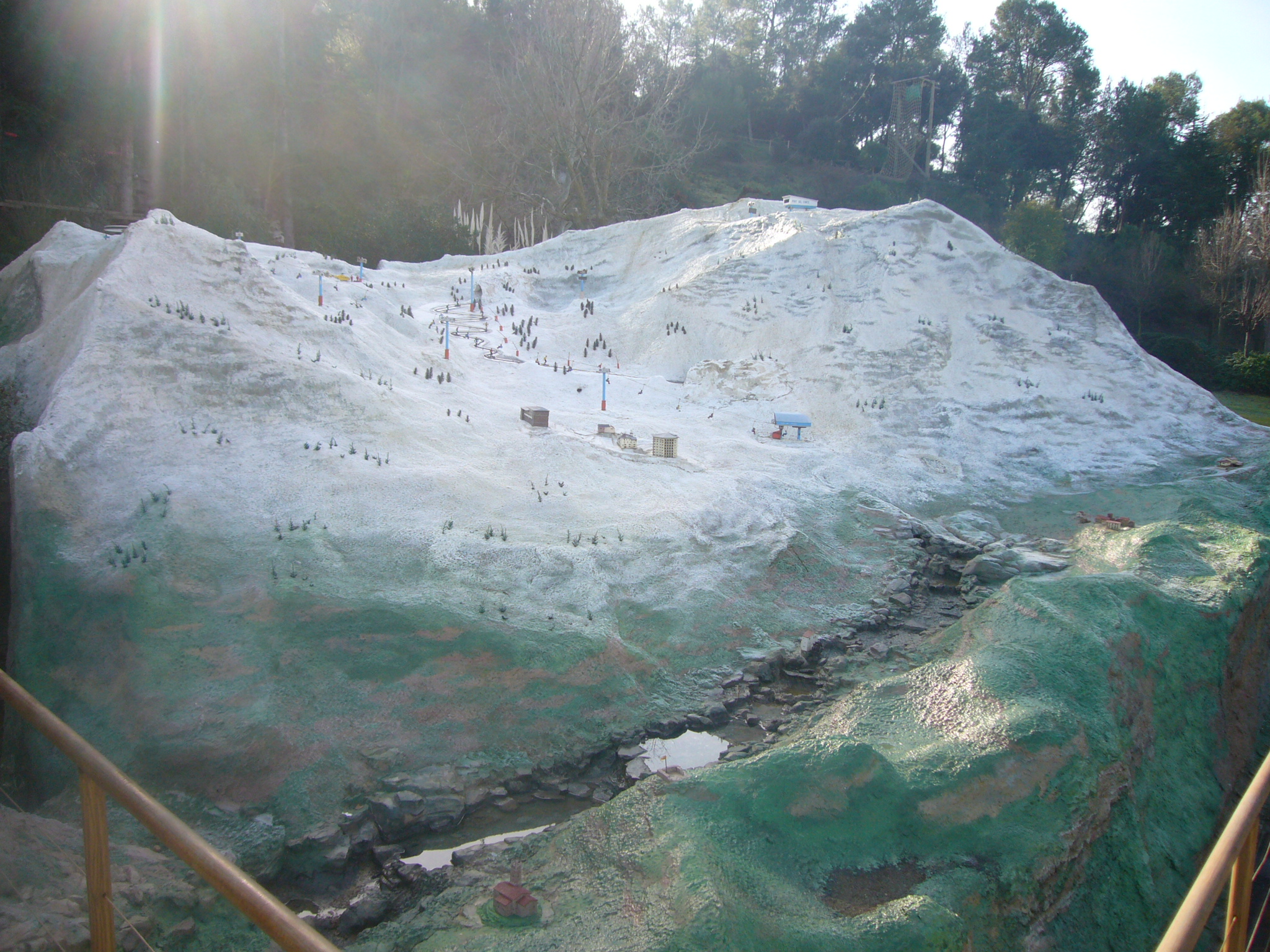
Model of the Port del Comte ski resort inaugurated in 2008

The first concept of creating this park came from Hans (Johannes A.) Lorijn, who had been involved in the construction of Minimundus in Austria and who later also designed and constructed Mini-Europe in Brussels. Fernando de Ercilla Ayestarán made a trip to Madurodam in 1981 which inspired him and as he knew about Hans Lorijn's plan, he joined the project becoming one of the shareholders. After the opening more financing was needed and Mr. Ercilla obtained all the shares. The laying in place of the first stone was done on May 6, 1983, presided by the mayor of Torrelles, the President of the Generalitat de Catalunya, Jordi Pujol, and the Catalan minister Joan Rigol, who was born in Torrelles. The park was open on that same year.

In June 1985 Nicolau Casaus, vice-president of FC Barcelona, laid in place the first stone of the Camp Nou and Mini Estadi scale models.

Fernando Ercilla, manager of the park, inaugurated in 2008 a scale model of the Port del Comte ski resort, which became the largest model exhibited in the park.

== Technical data ==
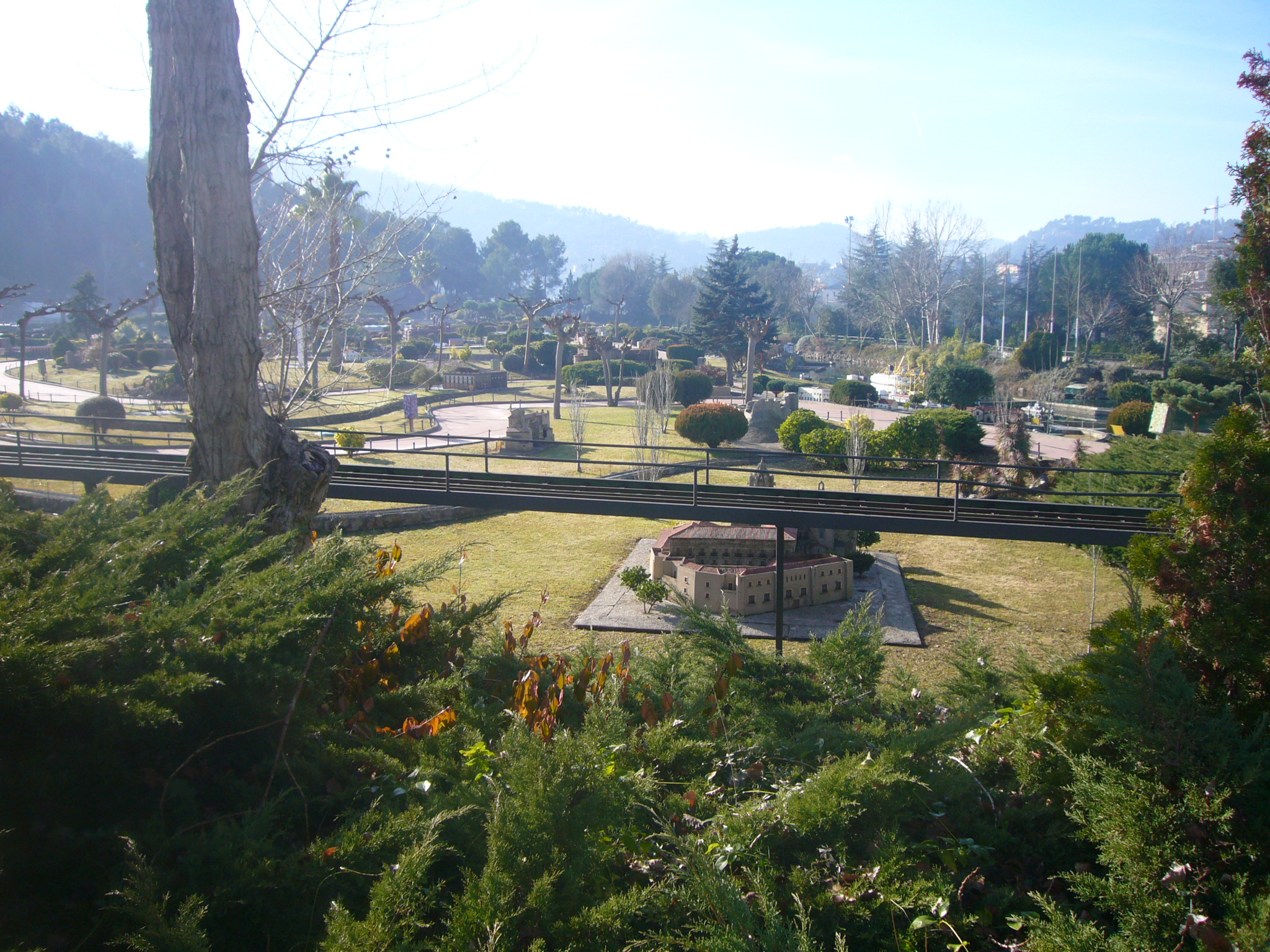
General view of Catalunya en Miniatura

Catalunya en Miniatura has a total of 60,000 m^{2} (650,000 sq ft), 35,000 m^{2} (380,000 sq ft) of them devoted to 147 scale models and 25,000 m^{2} (270,000 sq ft) for parking and services. Visitors follow a single path where the models are installed sorted by the geographical comarcas (counties) of Catalonia, and its four provinces (Barcelona, Girona, Lleida and Tarragona).

The scale models area includes 5,000 m^{2} (54,000 sq ft) of grass, 4,500 plants, 450 trees, 600 bonsais, 35 palm trees and more than 3,000 seasonal flower plants. It includes waterfalls, fountains and lakes decorated with 400 tons of stones. Nowadays the park has an amusement railway, 940 meter long, used by visitors along the external perimeter of the scale model area.

=== Construction of models ===
The scale models construction process includes several stages. At first, the architectural drawings of the building or monument are used to create new drawings at a scale 1:33 in the case of Barcelona city and 1:25 for the other buildings. The precision demanded by model makers requires highly accurate drawings as well as detailed photographs. After that, the model makers start working on the structure that will hold up the model. Doors and windows are created using silicon moulds where polyurethane is injected to obtain the desired shape.

When the building or monument has stone walls, there are two methods to do the engraving, either with previously engraved parts, or by directly engraving the walls of the model. After that, the cornices, balusters and handrails are added, and finally, the roof, which has one side that can be open to be able to access the electrical installation, because all models have their own electrical illumination.

Once the construction is finished, the model is painted using special paints that can resist atmospheric phenomena and temperature changes. At the location where the model is to be installed, the foundation is laid building a brick wall around the perimeter of the model, leaving an empty space inside where sand and stones will work as a filter for the rainwater, which goes away through a pipe connected to the main drainage. Finally, the finishing activities include gardening, streets, streetlights and decorative elements such as cars or persons.

It required many hours of labor to complete each model. For example, the scale model of the Sagrada Família church required 13,000 hours of work by 6 people, the Montserrat mountain 5,000 hours of work by 3 people, the Camp Nou stadium 4,000 hours of work by 3 people, the Monastery of Poblet 2,000 hours of work by 3 people, the Cathedral of Lleida 1,000 hours of work by 2 people, and the Torre Galatea (Dalí Theatre and Museum), 500 hours of work by 2 people.

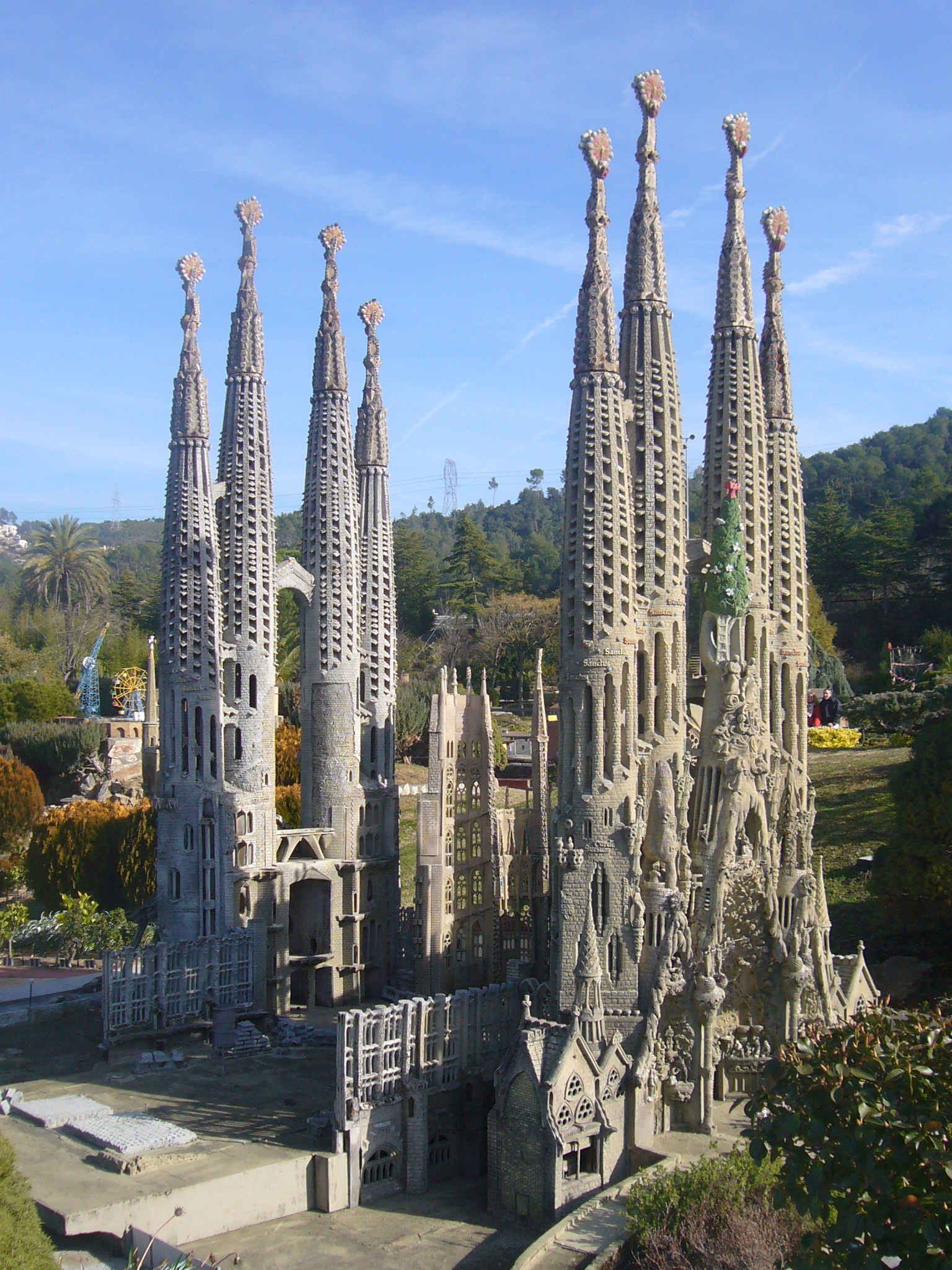
Model of Sagrada Família church (13,000 hours)

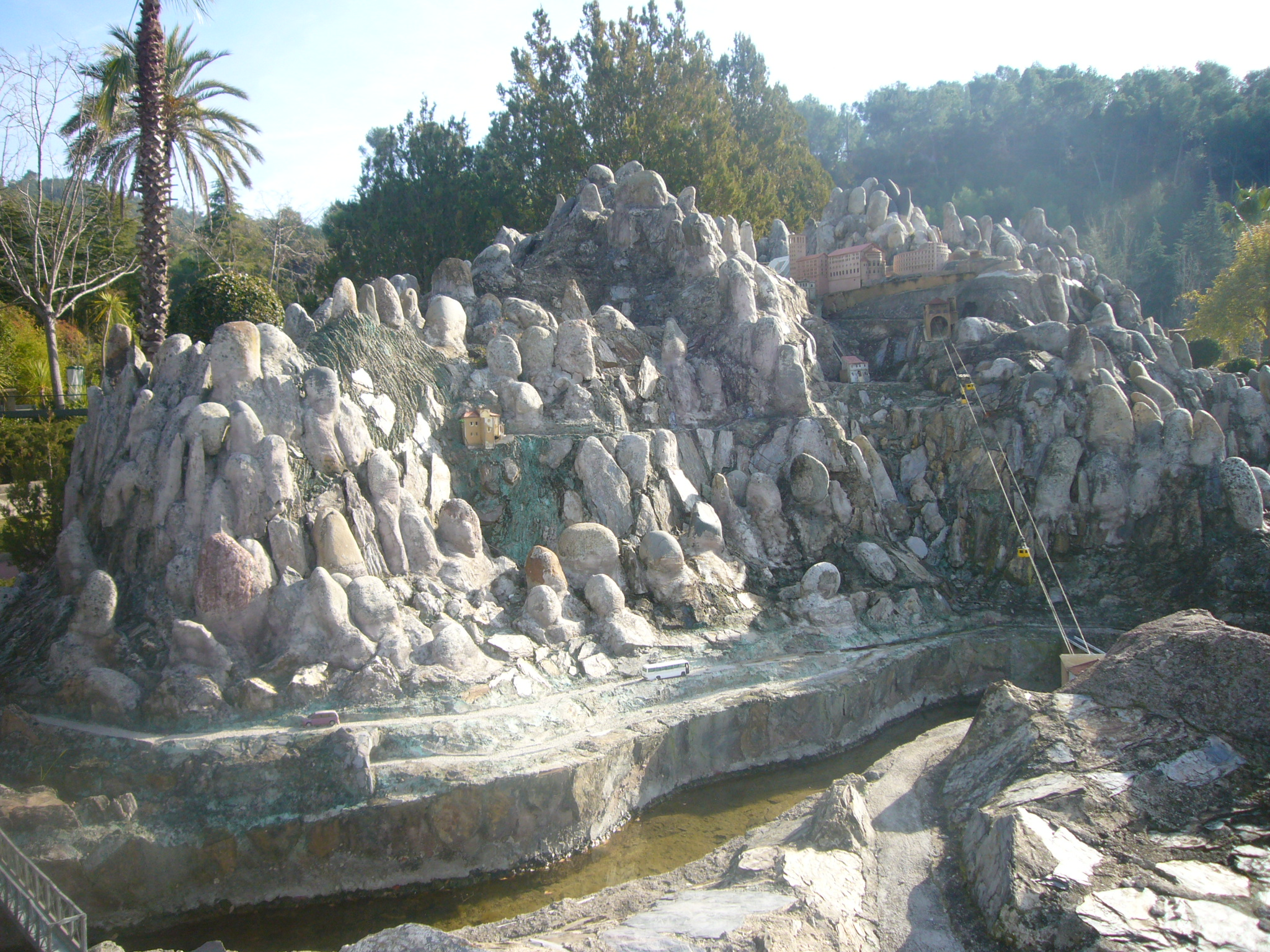
Model of Montserrat mountain (5,000 hours)

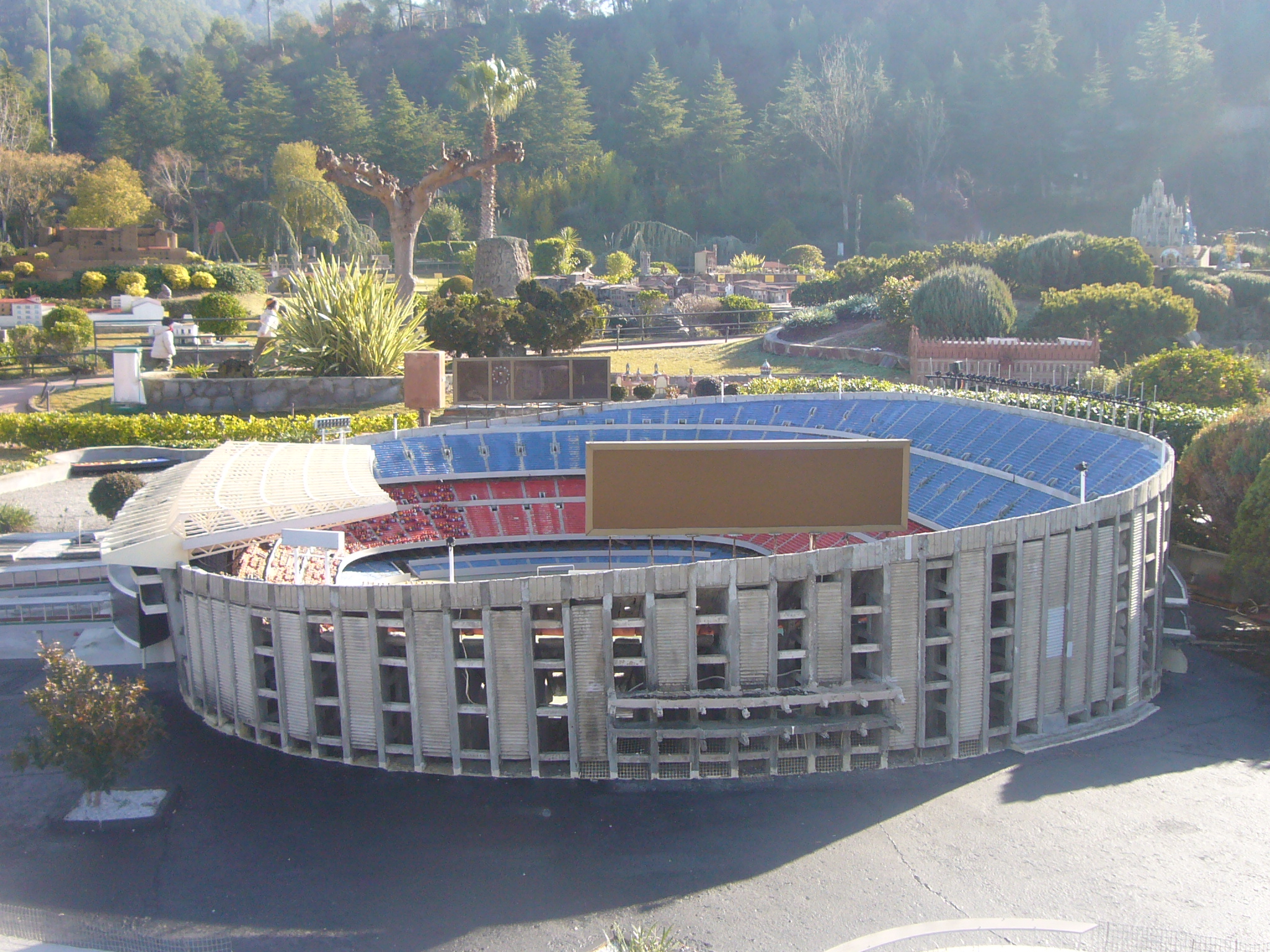
Model of Camp Nou (4,000 hours)

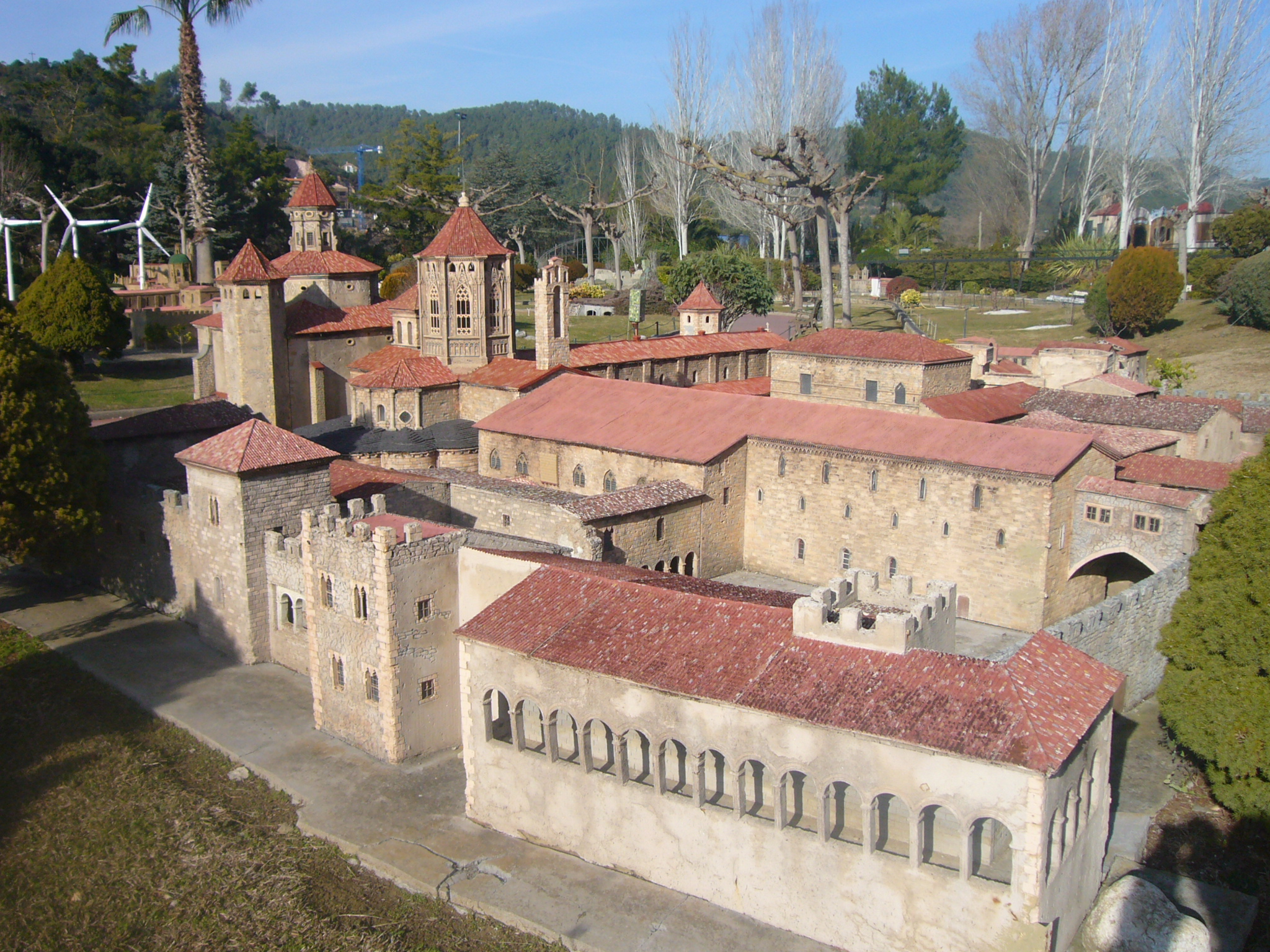
Model of Monastery of Poblet (2,000 hours)

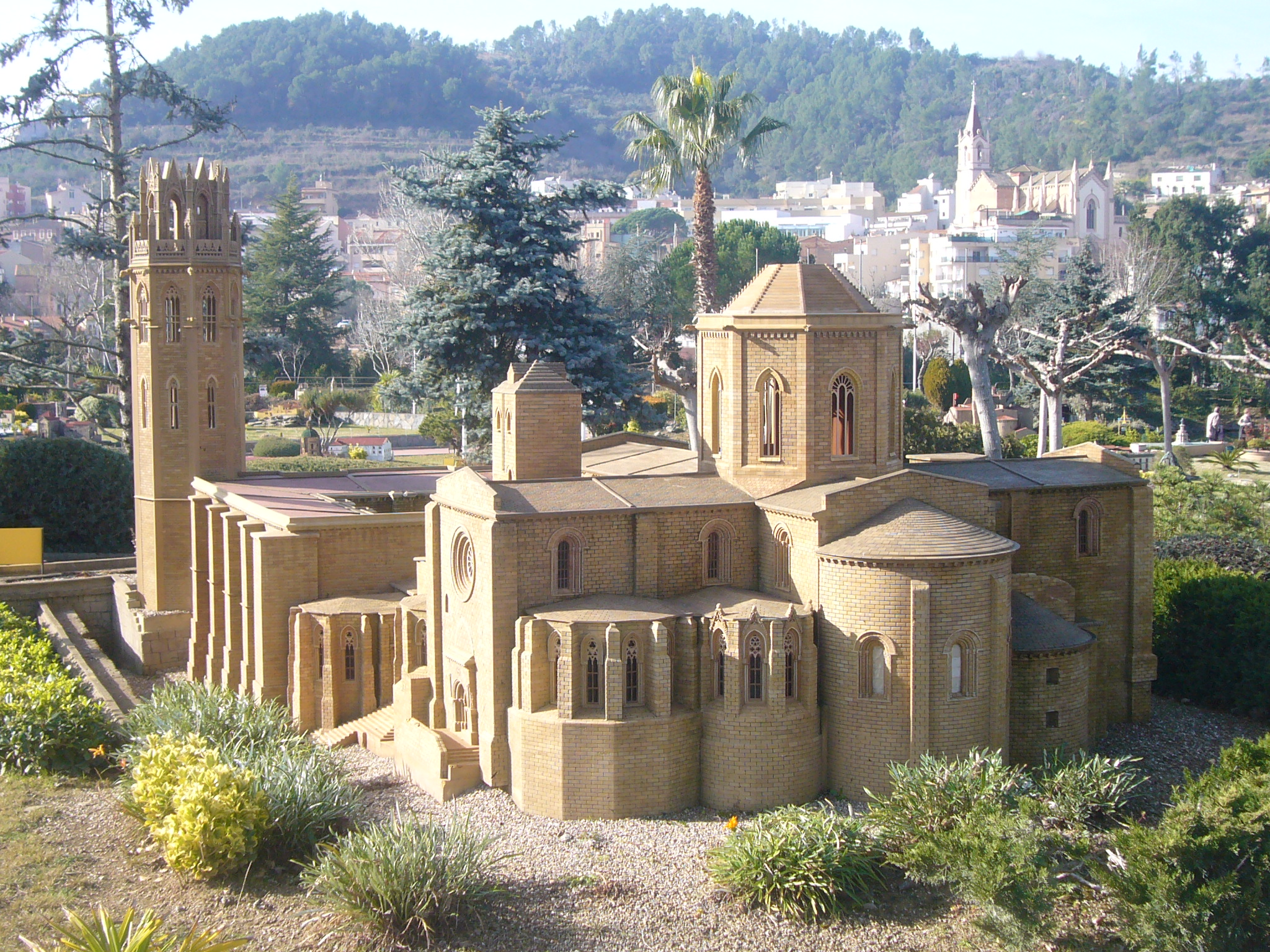
Model of Cathedral of Lleida (1,000 hours)

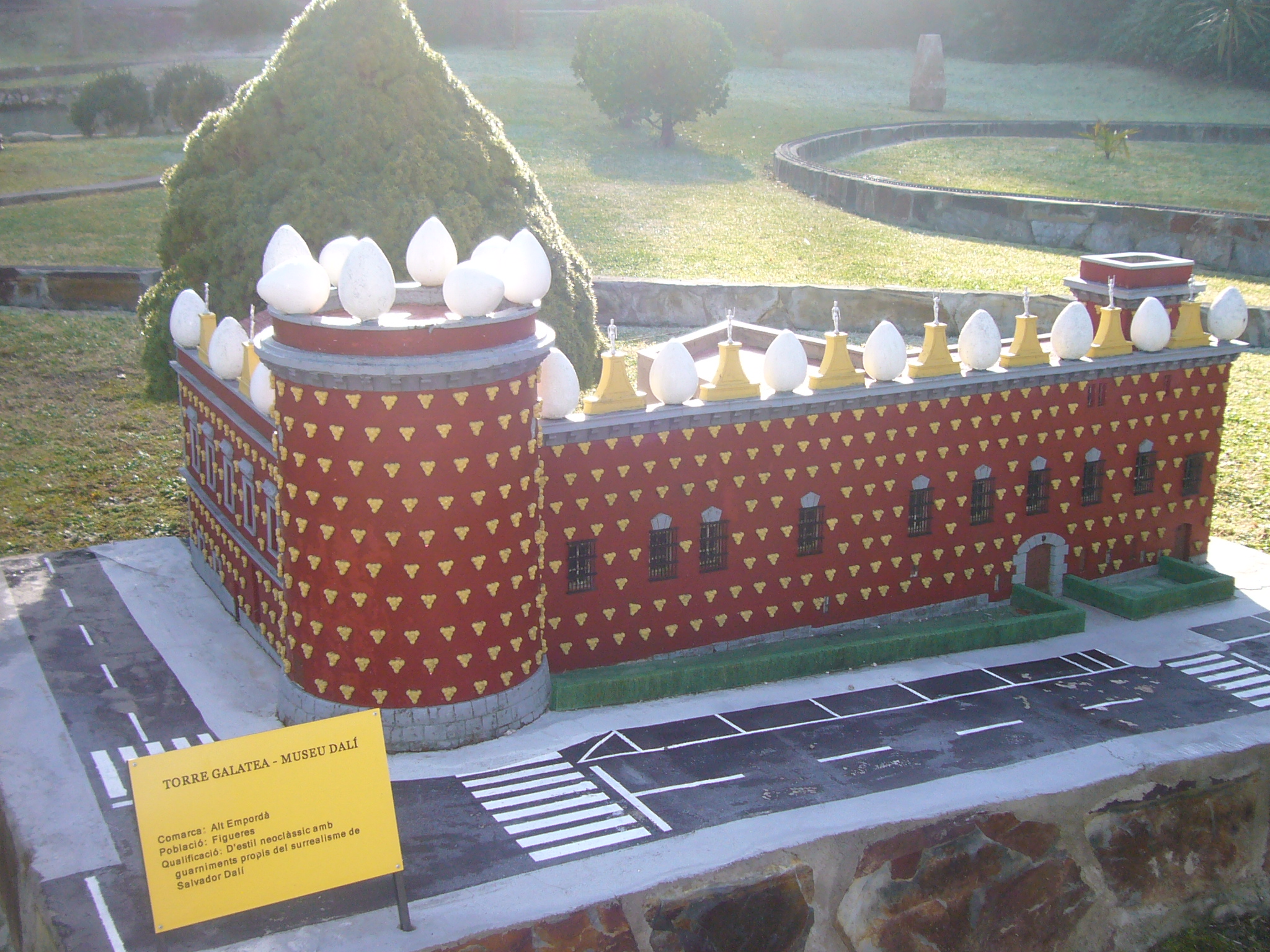
Model of Torre Galatea, Dalí Theatre and Museum (500 hours)

== Scale models exhibited ==
=== Barcelona city ===
- Palace of the Generalitat de Catalunya, Barcelona city hall and Plaça Sant Jaume, Parliament of Catalonia building, Cathedral of Barcelona, Pia Almoina de Barcelona, Casa de l'Ardiaca, Palau Reial Major and Chapel of Saint Agatha, Monastery of Sant Pau del Camp, University of Barcelona main building, Plaça de Catalunya square, Port of Barcelona, Port Vell Aerial Tramway, Llotja de Mar building, Military Government building, Columbus Monument, Estació de França railway station, old building of La Vanguardia newspaper at Pelai street, FC Barcelona facilities (Camp Nou stadium, Mini Estadi stadium, Palau de Gel ice-skating venue, Palau Blaugrana and La Masia building), Tibidabo amusement park, Sagrat Cor temple and Funicular del Tibidabo, Sagrada Família church, Parc Güell, Palau Güell, Güell Pavilions, Casa Batlló, Casa Calvet, La Pedrera, Bellesguard tower, Teresianes school, Casa Vicens and Les Planes railway station.

=== Barcelona province ===
- El Prat Airport, Televisió de Catalunya headquarters, Church of Colònia Güell, Chupa Chups factory, El Periódico de Catalunya building in Parets del Vallès, Granollers city hall, square Porxada de Granollers, Mataró train station, Calella lighthouse, El País building, Bimbo factory in Granollers, Monastery of Sant Cugat, Montserrat mountain, Monastery of Montserrat and Aeri de Montserrat, Pont del Diable (Martorell), castle and church of Santa Maria de la Tossa, Igualada train station, castle of Cardona, Manresa city hall, old bridge of Manresa, Manresa firemen station, Sant Jaume church at Castellbell i el Vilar, Cal Pupinet restaurant in Castellbisbal, Sitges seafront with Cau Ferrat Museum, Maricel Museum, church of Sant Bartomeu and Santa Tecla and train station, Celler Güell, Caves Codorníu and Caves Blancher (Sant Sadurní d'Anoia), Caves Rovellats (Sant Martí Sarroca), castle and church of Sant Martí Sarroca, Monastery of Santa Cecília de Montserrat, church of Torrelles de Llobregat, romanesque bridge in Vic, La Piara factory (Manlleu), Rupit village and Monastery of Sant Jaume de Frontanyà.

=== Girona province ===
- Cathedral of Girona, Monastery of Sant Pere de Galligants, Monastery of Ripoll, Ripoll city hall and archive, church of Sant Martí de Surroca (Ogassa), church of Nostra Senyora dels Àngels in Llívia, factory Néts de Joaquim Trias (Santa Coloma de Farners), medieval bridge of Besalú, Banyoles lake, church of Santa Maria de Porqueres, Galatea tower (Dalí Theatre and Museum), Monastery of Sant Pere de Rodes and Vilar Rural of Serhs group in Sant Hilari Sacalm.

=== Lleida province ===
- La Seu Vella cathedral in Lleida, Cathedral of Santa Maria d'Urgell, church of Sant Andreu in Oliana, church of Sant Climent in Coll de Nargó, church of Sant Pere in Ponts, church of Santa Maria in Balaguer, castle of La Floresta, Monastery of Vallbona de les Monges, Granja Castelló in Mollerussa, University of Cervera main building, Port del Comte (ski resort), ruins of the Sort castle, church of Santa Maria de Talló (Bellver de Cerdanya) and Romanesque churches of the Vall de Boí (Sant Quirc de Durro, La Nativitat de Durro, Santa Eulàlia d'Erill la Vall, Santa Maria de Cóll, Sant Feliu de Barruera, Santa Maria de Cardet, Sant Joan de Boí, Santa Maria de Taüll and Sant Climent de Taüll).

=== Tarragona province ===
- Cathedral of Tarragona, monument to Roger de Llúria and Tarragona city hall, Port of Tarragona, Aqüeducte de les Ferreres (Roman aqueduct), Arc de Berà, Cellar of Falset, Cellar of Pinell de Brai, Monastery of Santes Creus, Monastery of Poblet, Castle of Calafell, church of Sant Miquel in Segur de Calafell, Castle of la Suda (Tortosa), Castle of Móra d'Ebre and bridge of Amposta.

=== Mallorca ===
- Palma Cathedral

=== Antoni Gaudí works in the rest of Spain ===
- Casa de los Botines (León, Spain), El Capricho house (Comillas) and Episcopal Palace, Astorga.
