= Baixador de Vallvidrera (Barcelona–Vallès Line) =

Railway station in Barcelona, Spain

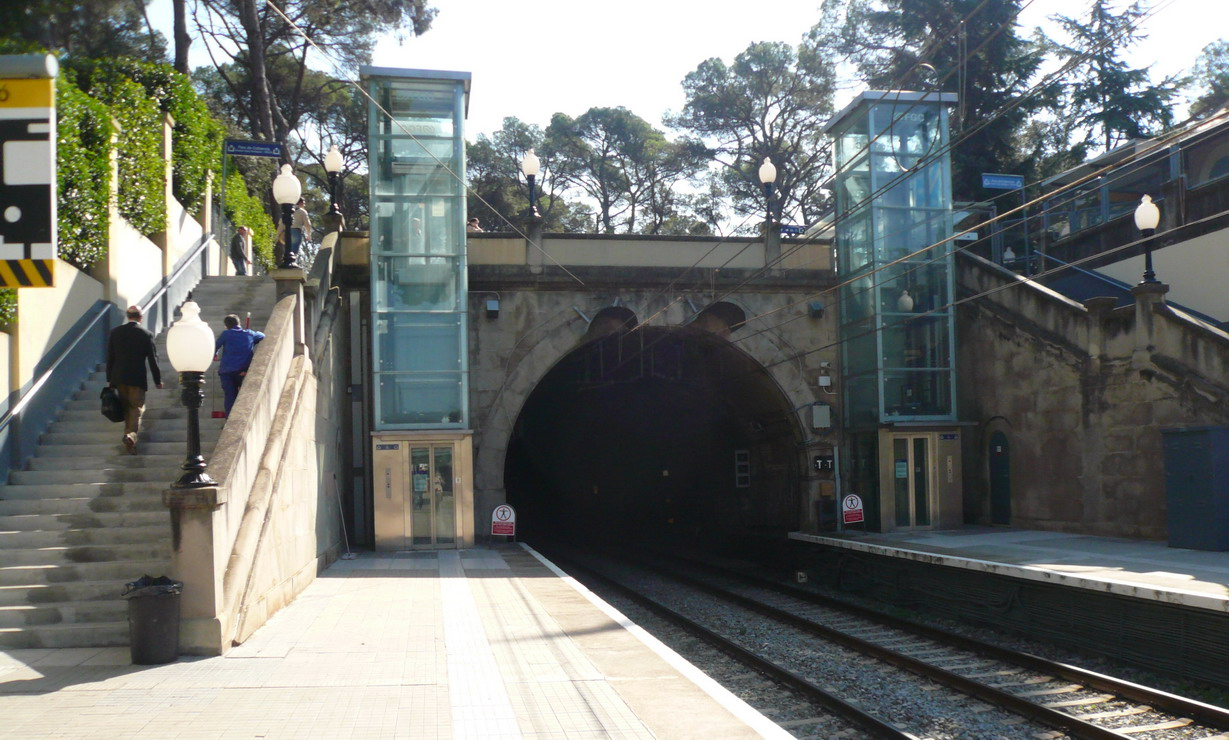

General information
- Location: Barcelona
- Coordinates: 41.419786°N 2.097289°E
- System: Metro del Vallès commuter rail station
- Owner: Ferrocarrils de la Generalitat de Catalunya
- Platforms: 2 side platforms
- Tracks: 2

Construction
- Structure type: Above ground

Other information
- Fare zone: 1 (ATM)

History
- Opened: 1916

Passengers
- 2018: 440,653

Services
Preceding station	FGC	Following station
Peu del Funicular towards Barcelona Pl. Catalunya	S1	Les Planes towards Terrassa Nacions Unides
Peu del Funicular towards Barcelona Pl. Catalunya	S2	Les Planes towards Sabadell Parc del Nord
Location

Baixador de Vallvidrera (Catalan pronunciation: [bəʃəˈðo ðə ˌβaʎβiˈðɾeɾə]) is a railway station in the Sarrià-Sant Gervasi district of Barcelona. It is served by lines S1 and S2 of the Metro del Vallès commuter rail system, which are operated by Ferrocarrils de la Generalitat de Catalunya, who also run the station.

The station has twin tracks and two side platforms. Access to the street is via stairs and lifts.

The station opened in 1916, with the opening of the Collserola tunnel and the line from Peu del Funicular station to the Vallès.

The GR 92 long-distance footpath, which roughly follows the length of the Mediterranean coast of Spain, has a staging point at the station. Stage 18 links northwards to Montcada i Reixac, a distance of 16.7 kilometres (10.4 mi), whilst stage 19 links southwards to Sant Vicenç dels Horts, a distance of 13.6 kilometres (8.5 mi). The railway provides good access to both stages from the centre of the city of Barcelona.

== See also ==
- List of railway stations in Barcelona
