= Vallvidrera Funicular =

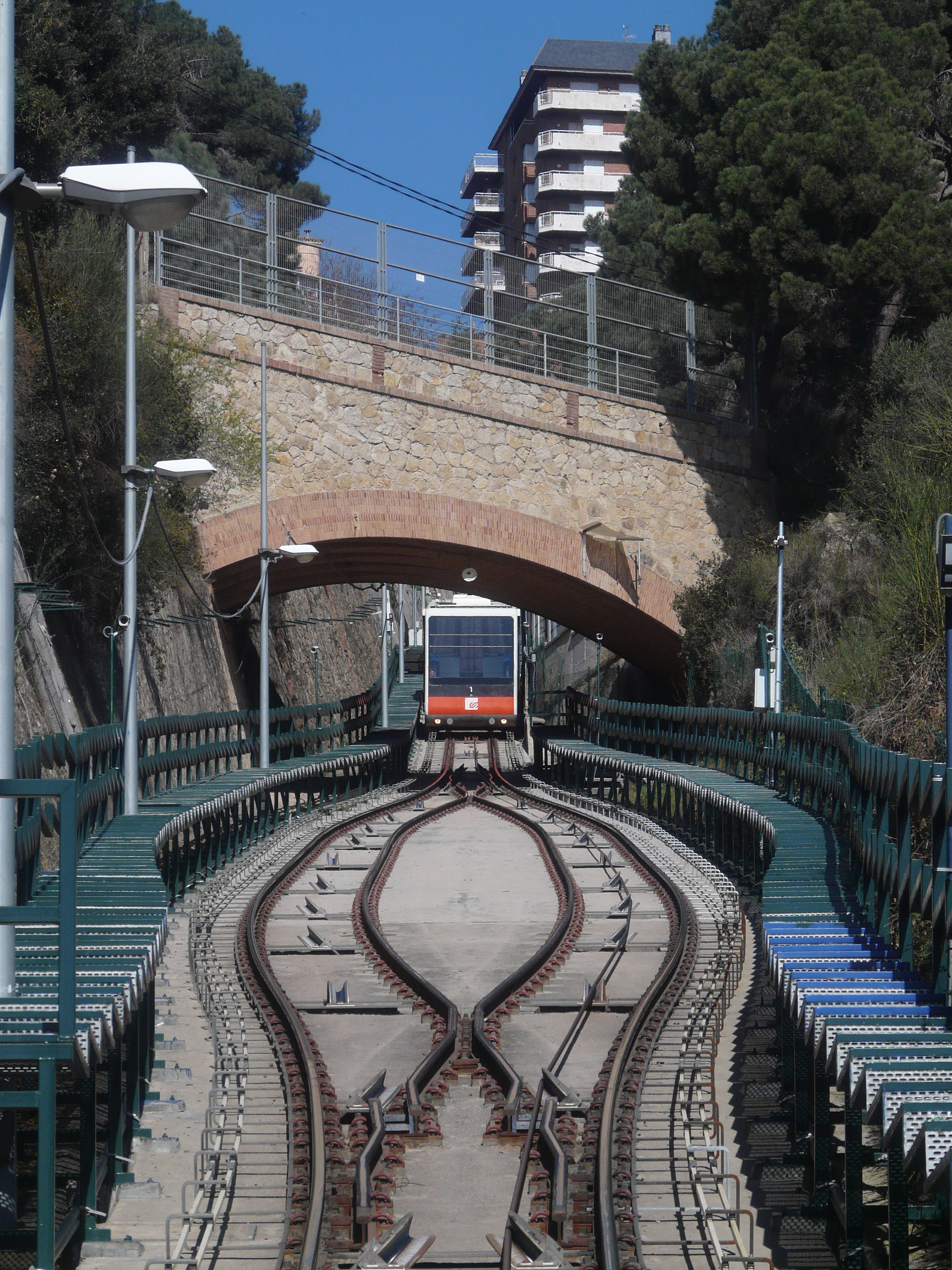
- A funicular car with the line's passing loop in the foreground.

Overview
- Native name: Funicular de Vallvidrera
- Status: Operational
- Owner: Generalitat of Catalonia
- Locale: Sarrià-Sant Gervasi, Barcelona
- Termini: Vallvidrera Inferior; Vallvidrera Superior
- Stations: 3 (list)

Service
- Type: Funicular
- Operator: Ferrocarrils de la Generalitat de Catalunya (FGC)
- Rolling stock: 2 Gangloff funicular cars
- Ridership: 760,261 passenger journeys (2013) (Note: This number has been obtained by suming usage figures for each of the three stops on the funicular.)

History
- Opened: 24 October 1906

Technical
- Line length: 736.6 m (2,417 ft)
- Number of tracks: 1 (with an intermediate passing loop)
- Character: At-grade
- Track gauge: 1,000 mm (3 ft 3 3/8 in) metre gauge
- Electrification: 220 V DC third rail
- Operating speed: 5 m/s (16 ft/s)

The Vallvidrera Funicular (Catalan and Spanish: Funicular de Vallvidrera) is a 736.6-metre-long (2,417 ft) funicular railway in the Barcelona district of Sarrià-Sant Gervasi, in Catalonia, Spain. It connects Peu del Funicular station on the Barcelona–Vallès Line with the residential neighborhood of Vallvidrera, in the Collserola mountain range.

Opened on 24 October 1906, the funicular has played a key role in the development of Vallvidrera and is the main public transport access to this neighborhood. Although initially privately owned by Ferrocarril de Sarrià a Barcelona (FSB), it was transferred to the Catalan government together with the Barcelona–Vallès Line after FSB's economic collapse. Thus, since 7 October 1979, the funicular has been operated by Ferrocarrils de la Generalitat de Catalunya (FGC). In 1998, it was entirely rebuilt and upgraded to an automated guideway transit (AGT) system, including the introduction of new rolling stock.

The funicular is integrated as part of the Vallès Metro high-frequency commuter rail scheme. It runs at a basic interval of 6 minutes on weekdays, less frequently on weekends and public holidays, with a journey time of 2 minutes and 50 seconds (without considering any intermediate stops). Besides, it is entirely within fare zone 1 of the Autoritat del Transport Metropolità (ATM) fare-integrated public transport system for the Barcelona metropolitan area.

== History ==
The line was opened in 1906. Its upper station (Vallvidrera Superior) was designed by the architects Bonaventura Conill i Montobbio and Arnald Calvet i Peyronill in the Catalan Modernist style.

The line became part of the FGC network in 1981. It was rebuilt in 1998, with the introduction of new cars, platform screen doors and fully automated operation. The new cars were built by Gangloff of Bern.

== Technical features ==
The funicular has the following technical parameters:

Number of stops	3
Configuration	Single track with passing loop
Track length	729 m (2,392 ft)
Rise	165 m (541 ft)
Maximum gradient	30.9%
Track gauge	1,000 mm (3 ft 3 3/8 in) metre gauge
Number of cars	2
Capacity	50 passengers per car
Maximum speed	5 m/s (16.4 ft/s)
Traction	Electricity
Operation	Fully automatic

== List of stations ==
The following table lists the name of each station on the Vallvidrera Funicular in ascendent order (from south to north), a photo of the current station, its elevation, its coordinates, remarkable notes and usage figures.

Station	Photo	Elevation	Coordinates	Notes	Usage (Note: All usage figures (entry only) are in thousands per year for 2013. Note that in the case of Vallvidrera Inferior station, figures for Peu del Funicular station are included as well.)
Vallvidrera Inferior		192 m 630 ft	41.4093229°N 2.1112435°E	Connects with Peu del Funicular station on the Barcelona–Vallès Line, offering a transfer to Vallès Metro commuter rail lines S1 and S2.	348.9
Carretera de les Aigües		302 m 991 ft	41.4123064°N 2.1079693°E	Serves the popular walking and cycling route known as Carretera de les Aigües. It is a request stop.	20.9
Vallvidrera Superior		359 m 1,178 ft	41.4141203°N 2.1057955°E	Serves the main residential area of the Barcelona neighborhood of Vallvidrera.	390.5

== Bibliography ==
- Salmerón i Bosch, Carles (1988). El tren del Vallès: Història dels Ferrocarrils de Barcelona a Sabadell i Terrassa [The Vallès Train: History of the Barcelona to Sabadell and Terrassa Railway] (in Catalan). Barcelona: Terminus. ISBN 8440435606.
