= Port del Comte =

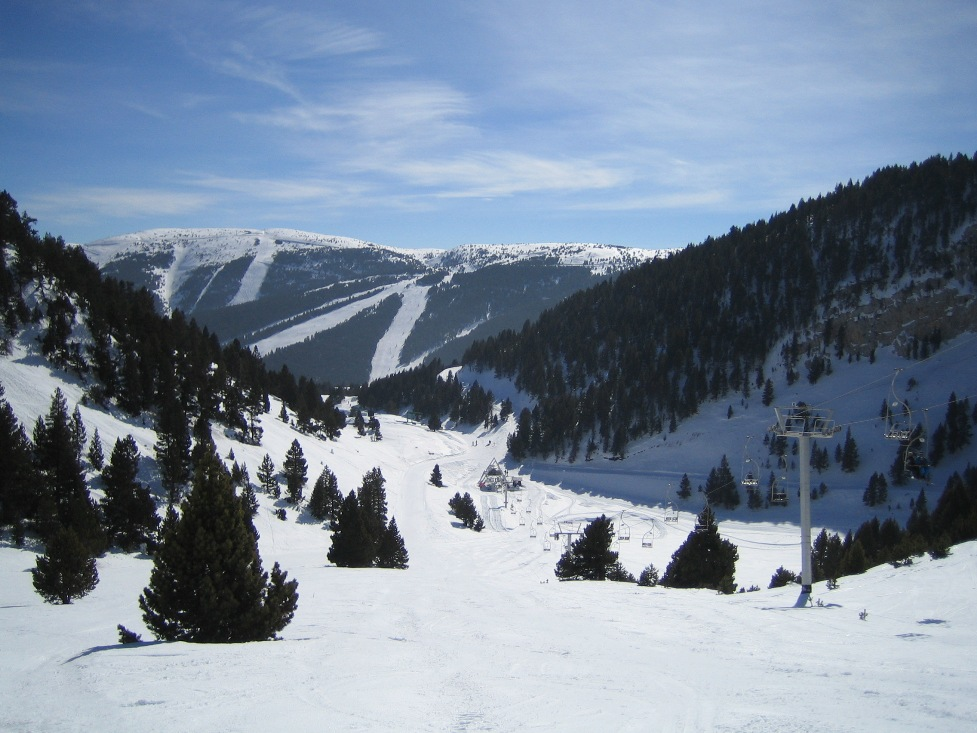
- Port del Comte from d'Estivella

- Location within Spain Location within Catalonia Location within Pyrenees
- Location: Port del Comte, Catalonia, Spain
- Nearest city: La Coma i la Pedra
- Coordinates: 42°10′22″N 1°33′43″E
- Vertical: 700 m (2,300 ft)
- Top elevation: 2,400 m (7,900 ft)
- Base elevation: 1,700 m (5,600 ft)
- Trails: Black: 5 Red: 13; Blue: 11; Green: 7; 36 Total (40km)
- Lift system: 15 Total (5 Chairlifts, 8 Platter lifts, 2 Carpets)
- Lift capacity: 15,460 per hr.
- Snowmaking: partial
- Website: portdelcomte.net

Port del Comte (Catalan pronunciation: [ˈpɔɾd dəl ˈkɔmtə]) is a ski resort in located in the Port del Comte mountain range, in the pre-Pyrenees, at the north of the Serra de Querol, in Catalonia, Spain. The ski area has a summit elevation of 2,400 m (7,900 ft) above sea level and a base of 1,700 m (5,600 ft) with a vertical drop of 700 m (2,300 ft).

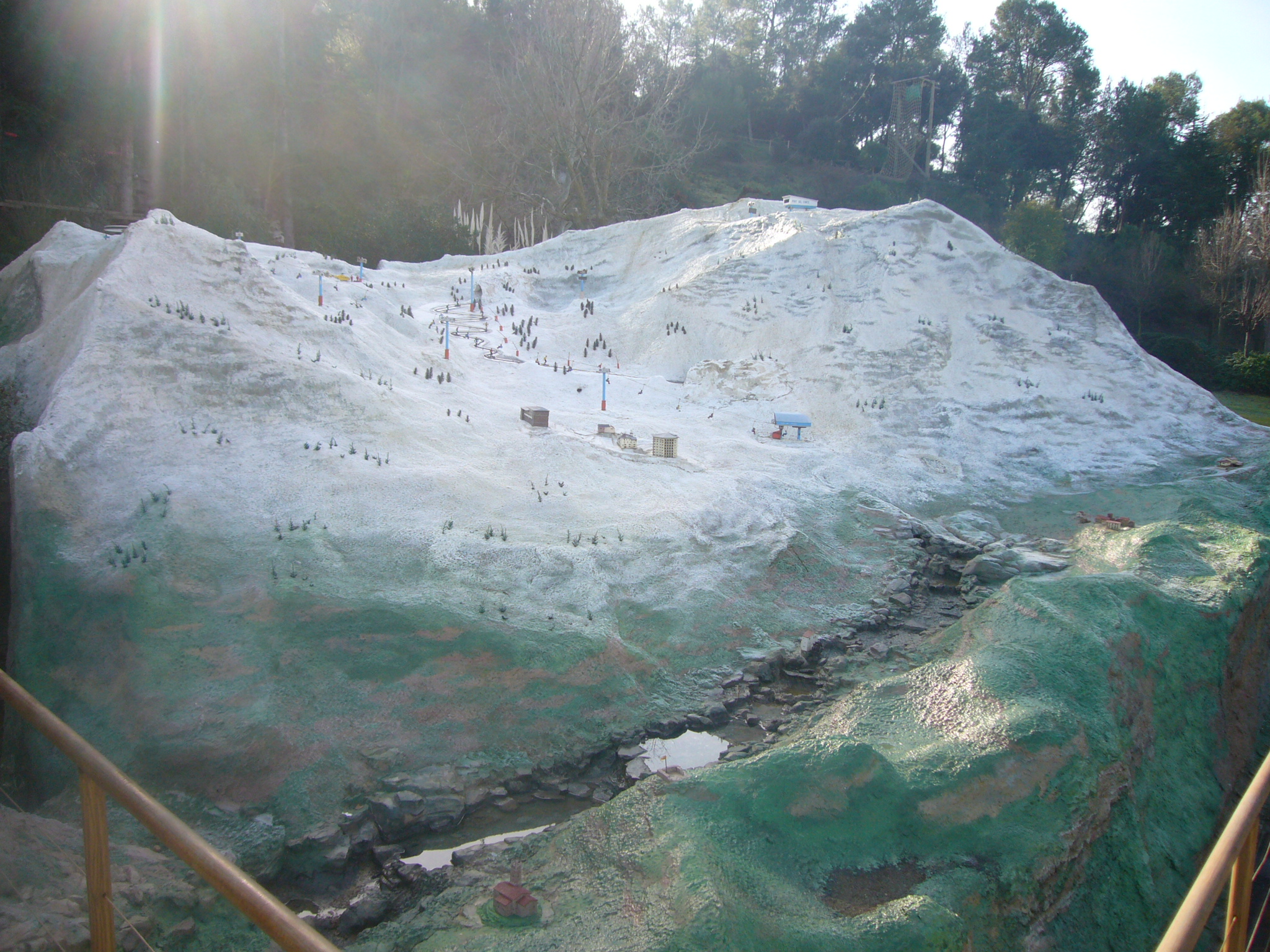
Scale model of the Port del Comte ski resort, at Catalunya en Miniatura

The resort is divided into two sectors: the first includes the Querol and north of Serrat de la Bòfia. It has all of the service centers and parking, as well as the lifts with greater capacity. Three chairlifts have been recently added, as well as snowmaking on some of the runs. The other sector is located in an area between the highest Pedró dels Quatre Batlles and Estivella. It has no road access: access is by a double chairlift from a south-southwest orientation of the runs, which often suffer from lack of snowpack. This area of the resort, which lacks snowmaking, is often closed when the other areas are open.
