= Peu del Funicular (Barcelona–Vallès Line) =

Railway and funicular station in Barcelona, Spain

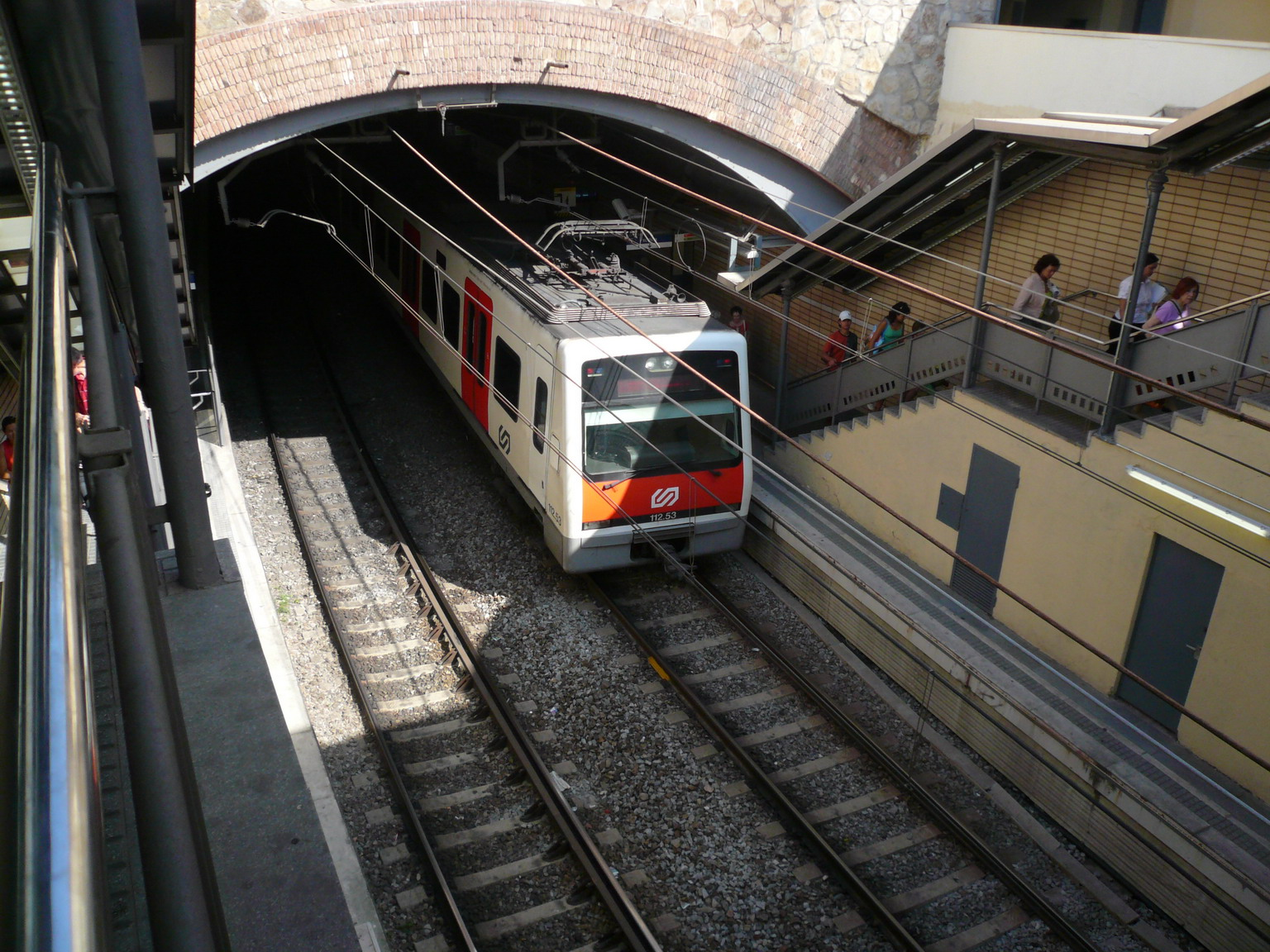

General information
- Location: Barcelona
- Coordinates: 41.409052°N 2.111435°E
- System: Metro del Vallès commuter rail station
- Owner: Ferrocarrils de la Generalitat de Catalunya
- Platforms: 2 side platforms (on the main line); 2 side platforms (on the funicular)
- Tracks: 2 (on the main line); 1 (on the funicular)

Construction
- Structure type: Partially underground

Other information
- Fare zone: 1 (ATM)

History
- Opened: 1906
- Rebuilt: 1916

Passengers
- 2018: 414,449

Services
Preceding station	FGC	Following station
Sarrià towards Barcelona Pl. Catalunya	S1	Baixador de Vallvidrera towards Terrassa Nacions Unides
Sarrià towards Barcelona Pl. Catalunya	S2	Baixador de Vallvidrera towards Sabadell Parc del Nord
Preceding station	Funicular de Vallvidrera	Following station
Terminus	Funicular de Vallvidrera	Carretera de les Aigües towards Vallvidrera Superior
Location

Peu del Funicular (Catalan pronunciation: [ˈpɛw ðəl funikuˈlar]) is a railway station in the Sarrià-Sant Gervasi district of Barcelona. It is served by lines S1 and S2 of the Metro del Vallès commuter rail system, and is also the lower terminus of the Funicular de Vallvidrera. Both commuter rail and funicular are operated by Ferrocarrils de la Generalitat de Catalunya, who also run the station.

The station has twin tracks on the main line, with twin side platforms. The main part of each side platform is in tunnel, and only long enough to accommodate two cars, although narrow extensions in the open air of the Sarrià side of the station allow passenger to disembark from, but not board, a third car. When four car trains are used, the car at the Vallès end of the train stops beyond the station and the doors do not open. Stairs, lifts and a footbridge connect these two platforms with the street level station entrance above, and with the funicular terminus above that.

The first station on the site opened in 1906, when it was the terminus of the line from Sarrià, providing an interchange with the funicular that allowed passengers to continue their journey to Vallvidrera on the hill above. In 1916, the Collserola tunnel opened, and subsequently the line onward to the Vallès opened. As a result, the station's platforms moved to their current, partly underground location.

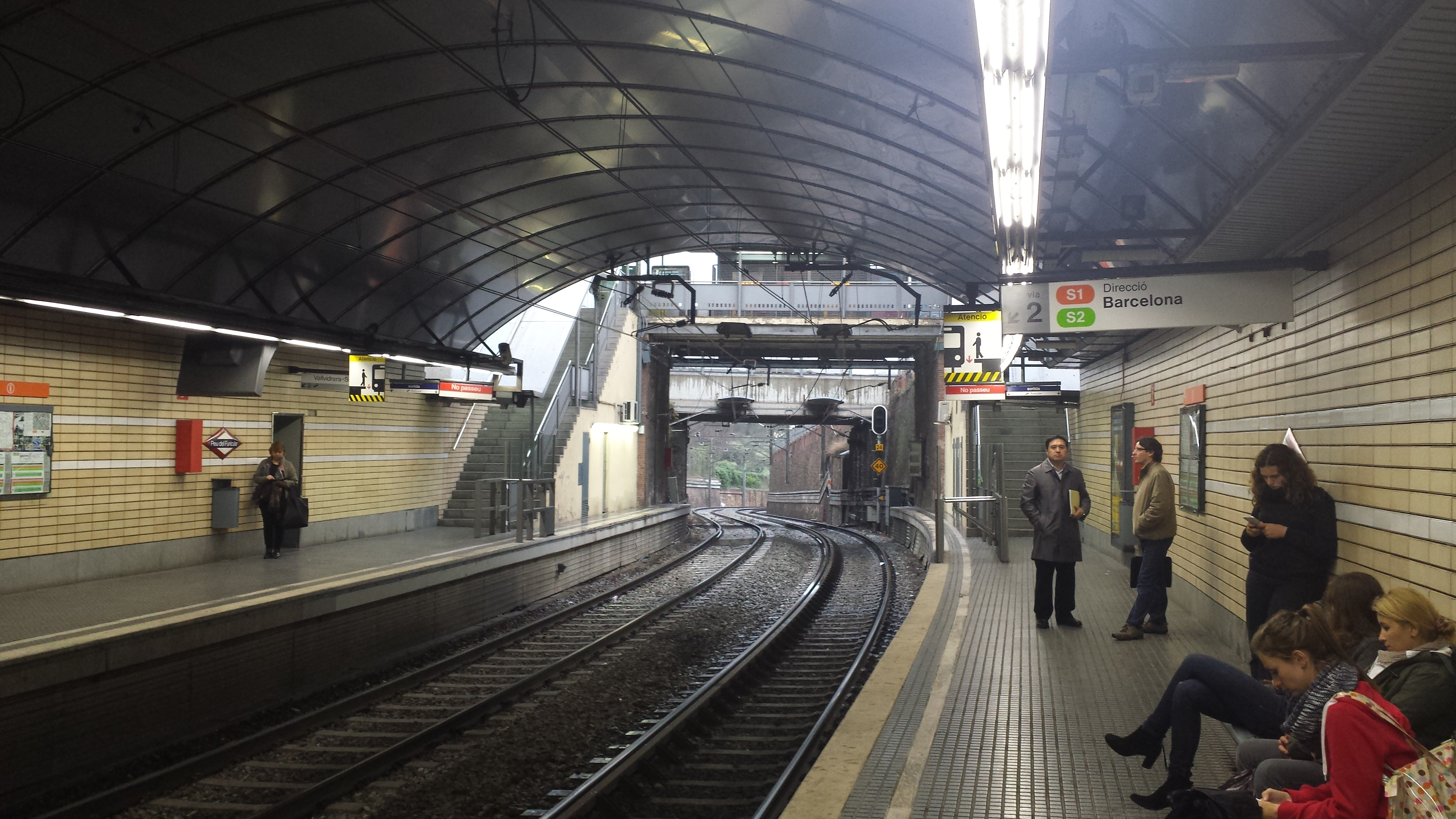
The station platform, looking south to the footbridge

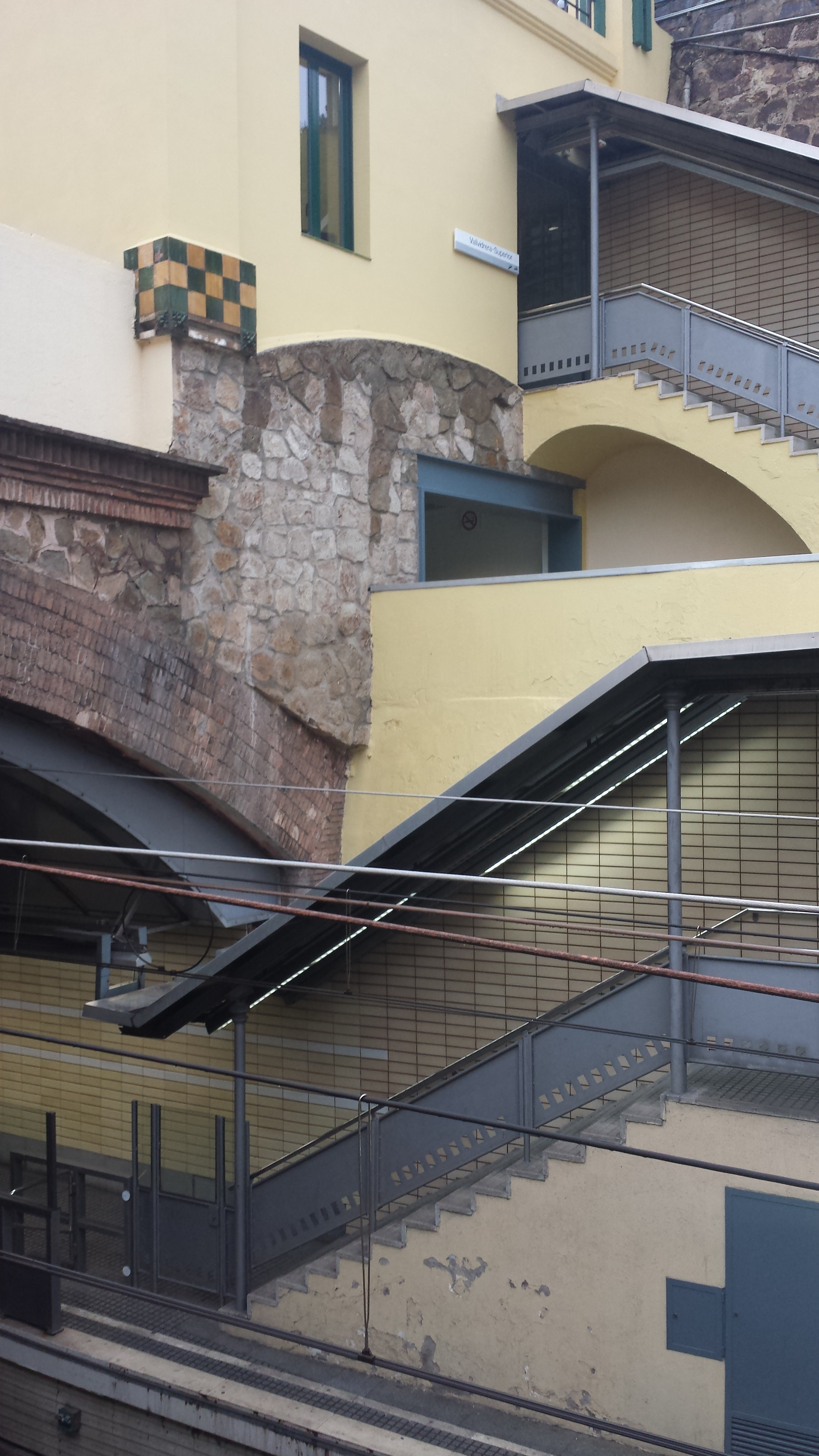
The station stairs.

== See also ==
- List of railway stations in Barcelona
