= Torrelles de Llobregat =

- Municipality
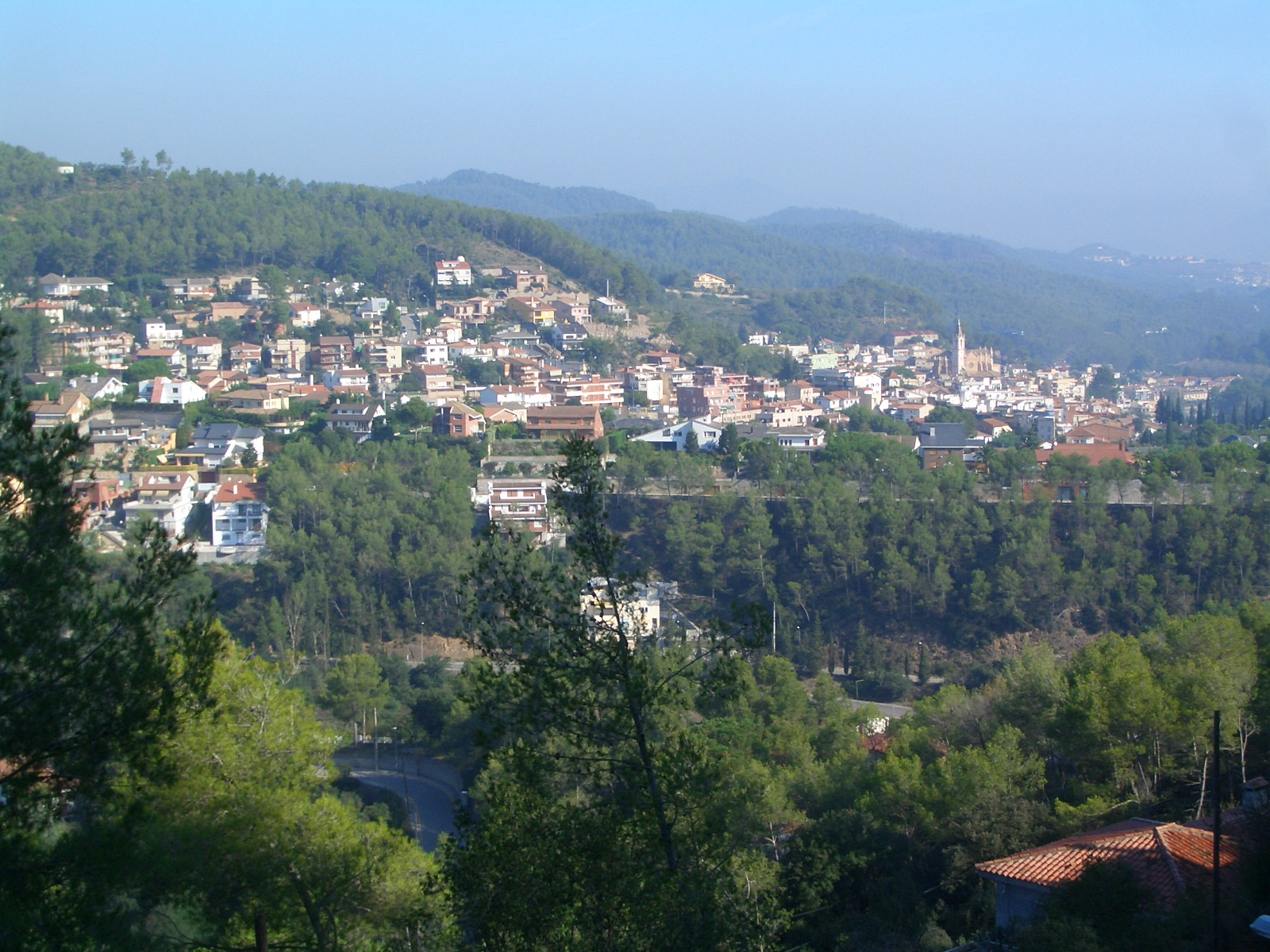
- View over Torrelles de Llobregat

- Coat of arms

- Location in Catalonia Torrelles de Llobregat (Spain)
- Coordinates: 41°21′32″N 1°58′56″E
- Country: Spain
- Community: Catalonia
- Province: Barcelona
- Comarca: Baix Llobregat

Government
  - Mayor: Ferran Puig Verdaguer (2015)

Area
  - Total: 13.6 km^{2} (5.3 sq mi)
- Elevation: 126 m (413 ft)

Population (2025-01-01)
  - Total: 6,170
  - Density: 454/km^{2} (1,180/sq mi)
- Website: www.torrelles.cat

Torrelles de Llobregat (Catalan pronunciation: [tuˈreʎəz ðə ʎuβɾəˈɣat]) is a municipality in the comarca of the Baix Llobregat in the province of Barcelona, Catalonia, Spain.

Catalunya en Miniatura, the largest of the 14 miniature parks present in Europe, is located here, 17 km from Barcelona.
