= Sant Cugat (Barcelona–Vallès Line) =

Railway station in Catalonia, Spain

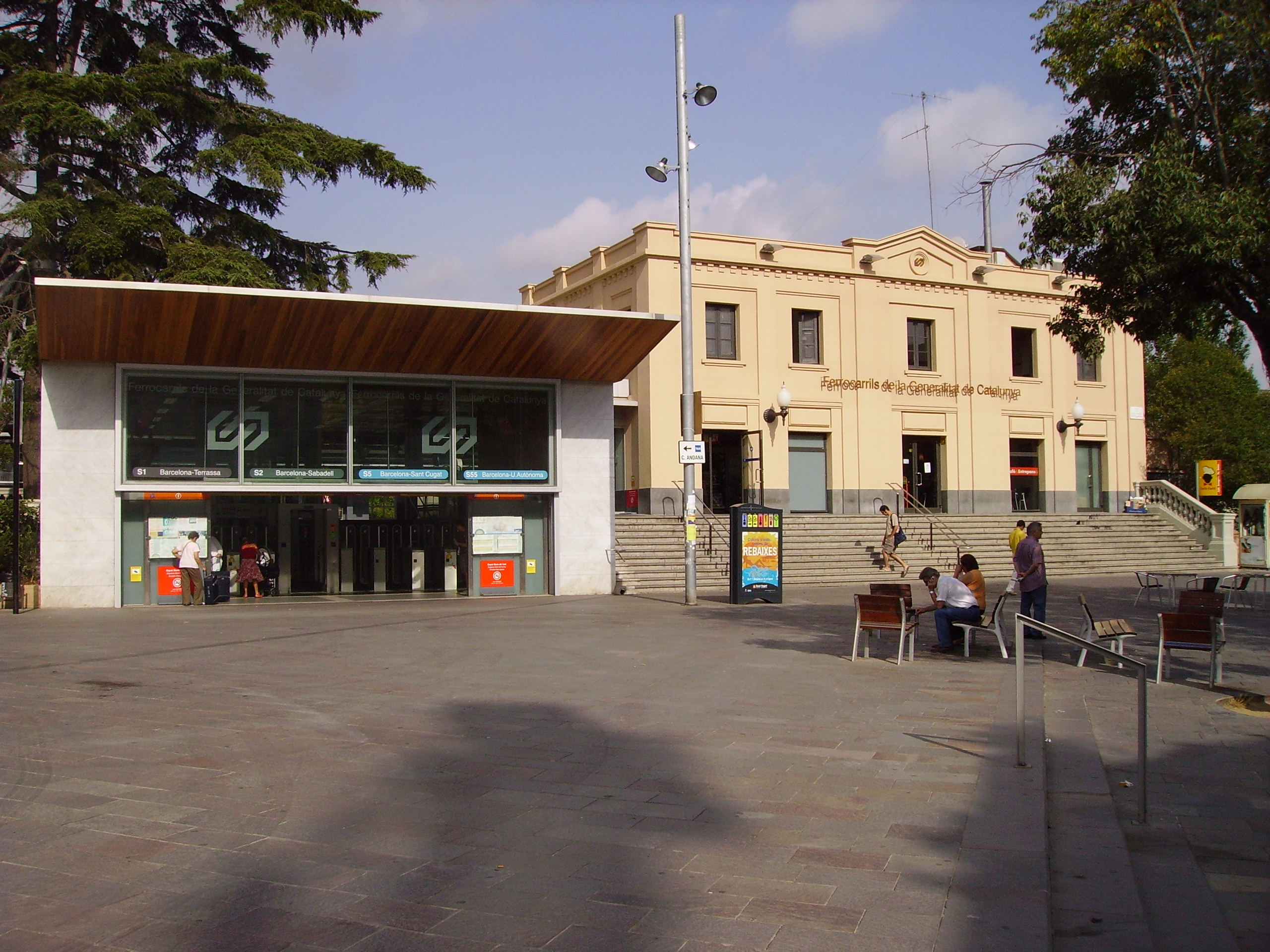
- Exterior view of the station

General information
- Location: Plaça Lluís Millet, Sant Cugat del Vallès; Spain
- Coordinates: 41°28′04.33″N 2°04′42.10″E
- System: commuter
- Owner: FGC
- Line: Barcelona–Vallès Line

Other information
- Station code: 620
- Fare zone: 2C

History
- Opened: 1917

Passengers
- 2018: 3,874,598

Services
Preceding station	FGC	Following station
Valldoreix towards Barcelona Pl. Catalunya	S1	Mira-sol towards Terrassa Nacions Unides
Valldoreix towards Barcelona Pl. Catalunya	S2	Volpelleres towards Sabadell Parc del Nord
Location

Sant Cugat Centre (Catalan pronunciation: [ˌsaŋ kuˈɣat sentɾə]) is a railway station in Sant Cugat del Vallès in Catalonia, Spain. It is served by lines S1 and S2 of the Metro del Vallès commuter rail system, which are operated by Ferrocarrils de la Generalitat de Catalunya (FGC), who also runs the station.

Sant Cugat Centre is the last station before the Metro del Vallès branches to Terrassa (line S1) and Sabadell (line S2) split and take different routes. The station is in fare zone 2C of the Autoritat del Transport Metropolità fare system.

The station has twin tracks, with two side platforms, and a pedestrian subway links the two platforms. Immediately to the north of the station is a flat junction between the two branches. Beyond this junction, between the tracks of the Sabadell branch, is a siding used as a turning point for trains on lines S1 and S2 during late nights, it was formerly used by S5 trains.

The station opened in 1917 with the opening of the line from Les Planes.

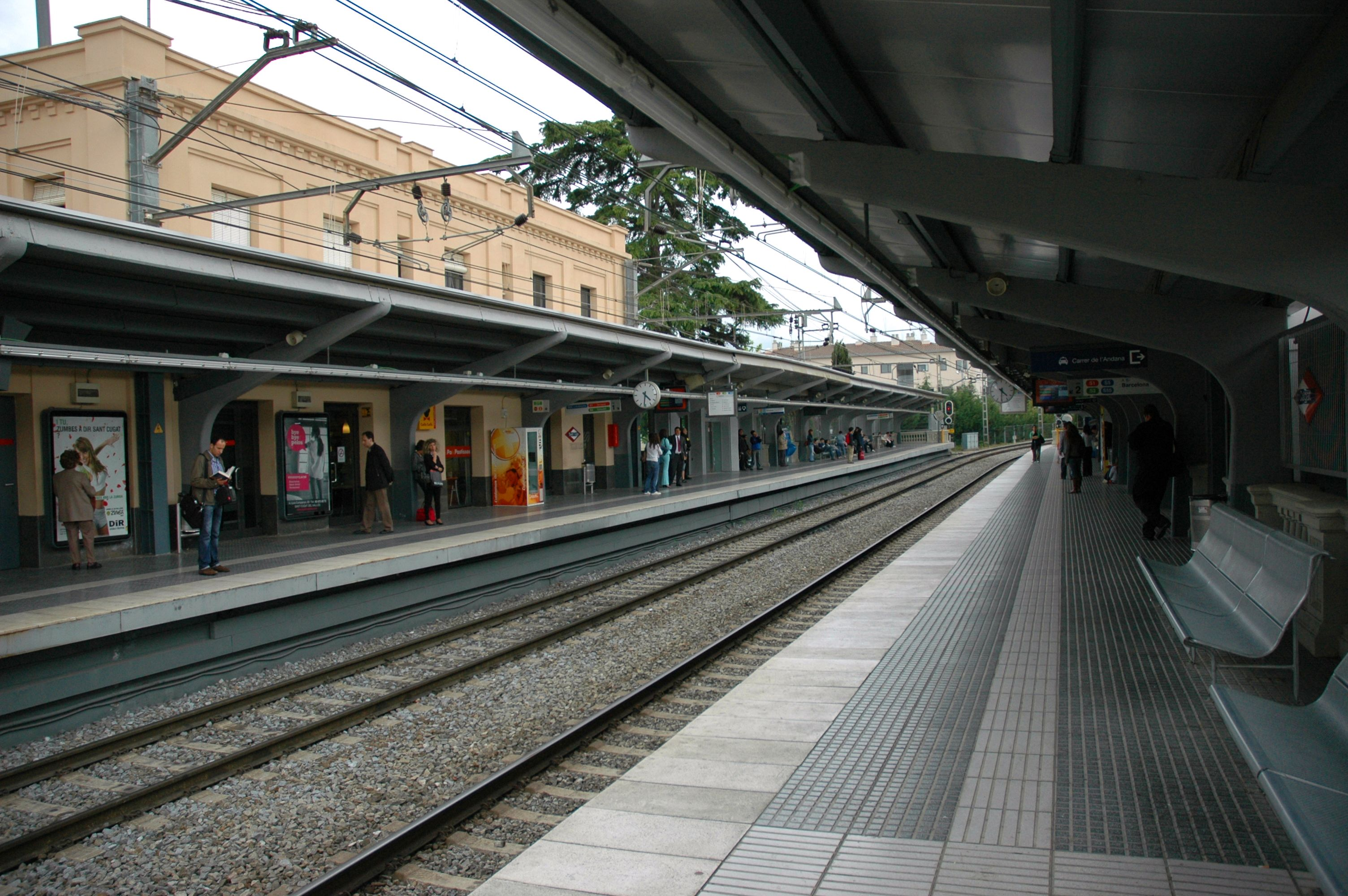
Station platforms

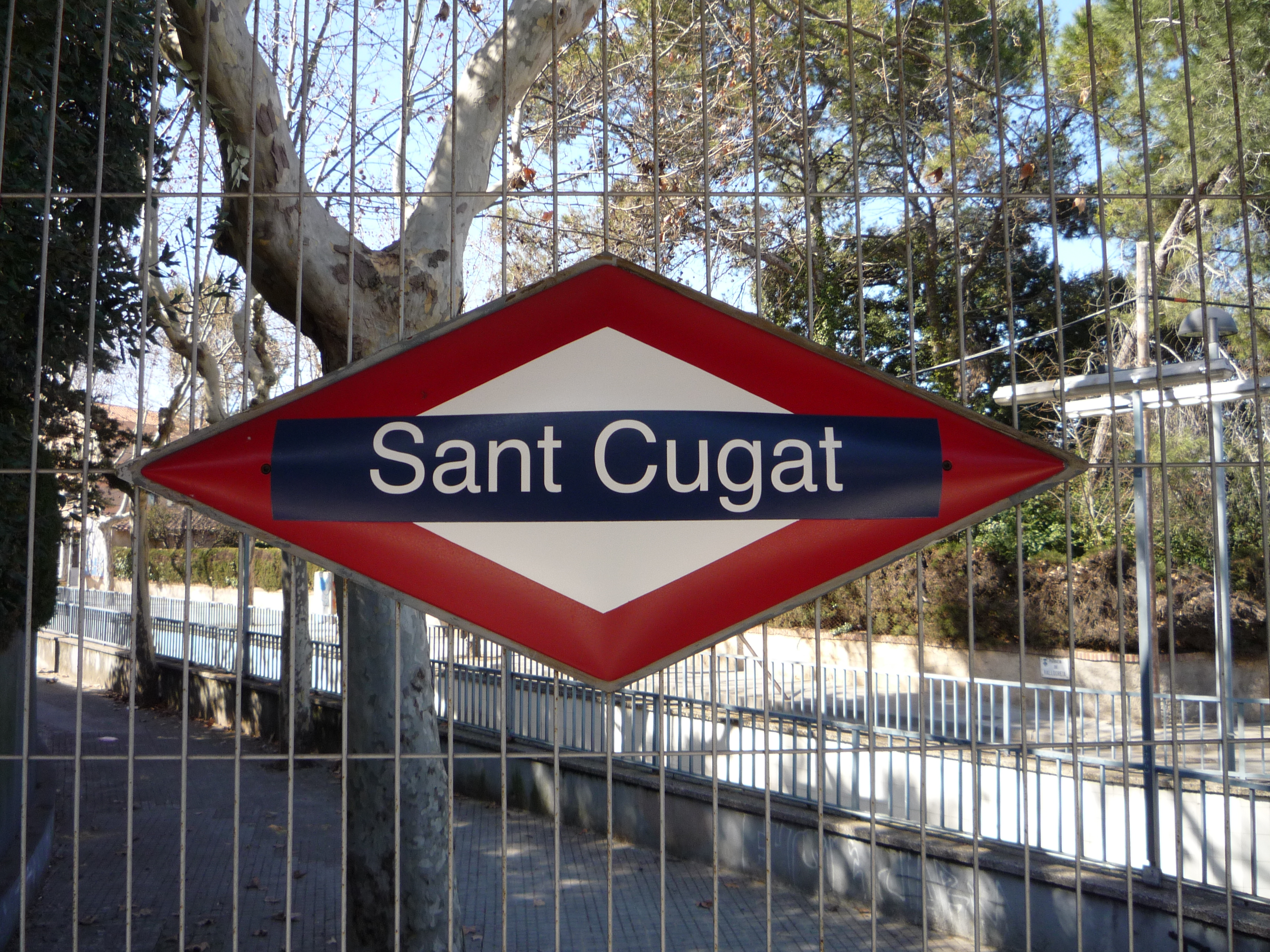
Station name plate
