= Les Fonts (disambiguation) =

Les Fonts is a town in Vallès Occidental, province of Barcelona, Catalonia, Spain

Les Fonts may also refer to:

- Les Fonts (Barcelona–Vallès Line) railway station at Les Fonts
- Les Fonts del Cardener, in the municipality of La Coma i la Pedra, Solsonès, Catalonia, Spain, source of the Cardener river

== See also ==
- Saint-Paul-les-Fonts, a commune in the Gard department in southern France
- Sant Joan les Fonts, a municipality of the comarca of Garrotxa, located in Girona, Catalonia, Spain
