= Mira-sol (Barcelona–Vallès Line) =

Railway station in Catalonia, Spain

Mira-Sol
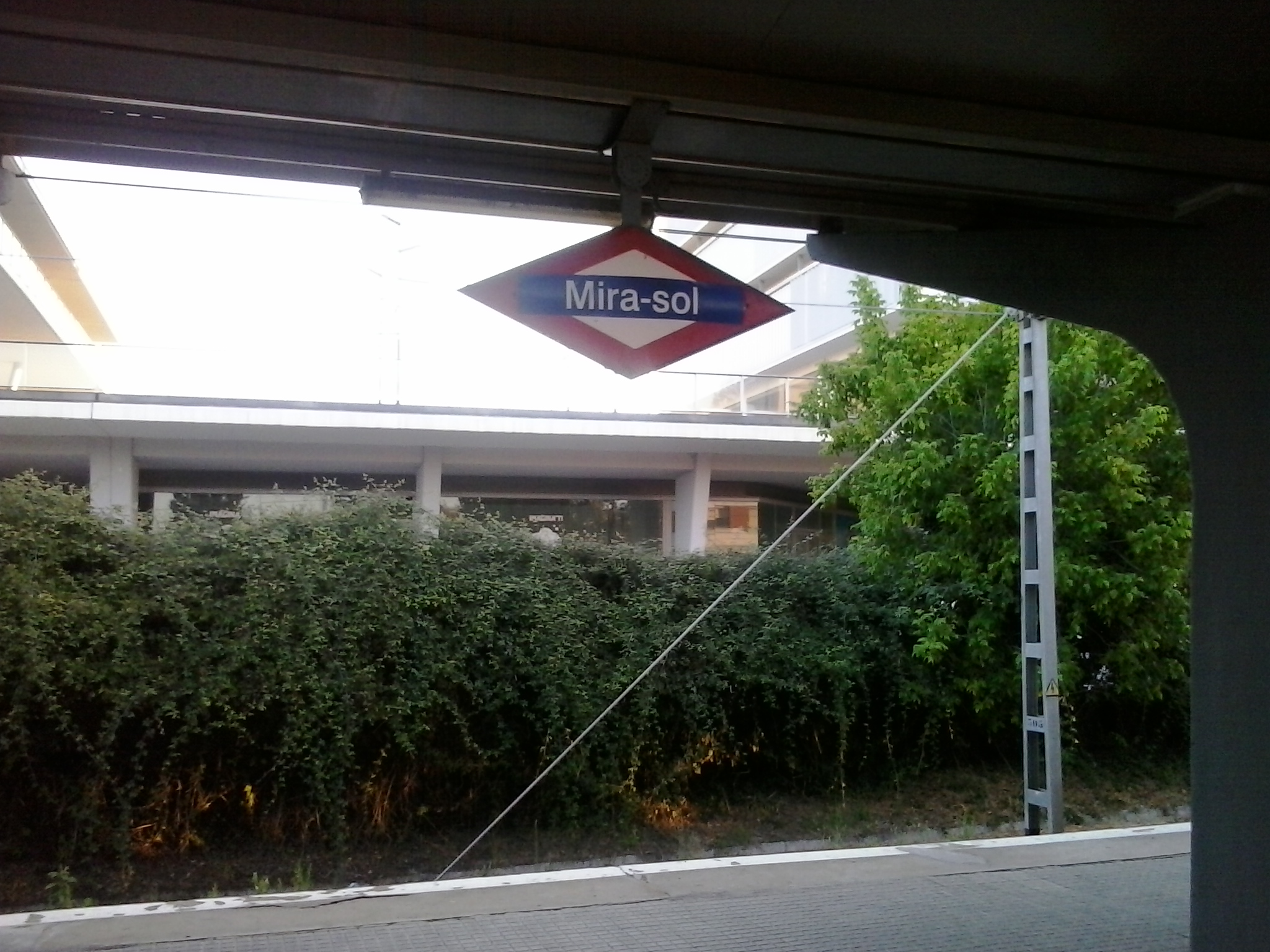

General information
- Location: Plaça Juan Borràs, Sant Cugat del Vallès, Catalonia; Spain
- Coordinates: 41°28′09.11″N 2°03′43.08″E
- System: commuter
- Owner: FGC
- Line: S1, S5

Other information
- Station code: 621
- Fare zone: 2C

History
- Opened: 1948

Passengers
- 2018: 700,691

Services
Preceding station	FGC	Following station
Sant Cugat towards Barcelona Pl. Catalunya	S1	Hospital General towards Terrassa Nacions Unides
Sant Cugat towards Barcelona Pl. Catalunya	S7	Hospital General towards Rubí
Location
- Location within Catalonia Location within Spain

Mira-Sol (Catalan pronunciation: [ˌmiɾəˈsɔl]) is a railway station of the Ferrocarrils de la Generalitat de Catalunya (FGC) train system in the province of Barcelona, Catalonia, Spain. It is in the municipality Sant Cugat del Vallès, in the comarca of Vallès Occidental. It is serviced by FGC lines S1, and S7. The station is in fare zone 2C.

The station was opened in 1948 even though trains had already been passing through the station since 1918.
