= Pàdua station (Barcelona) =

Metro station in Barcelona, Spain

Pàdua
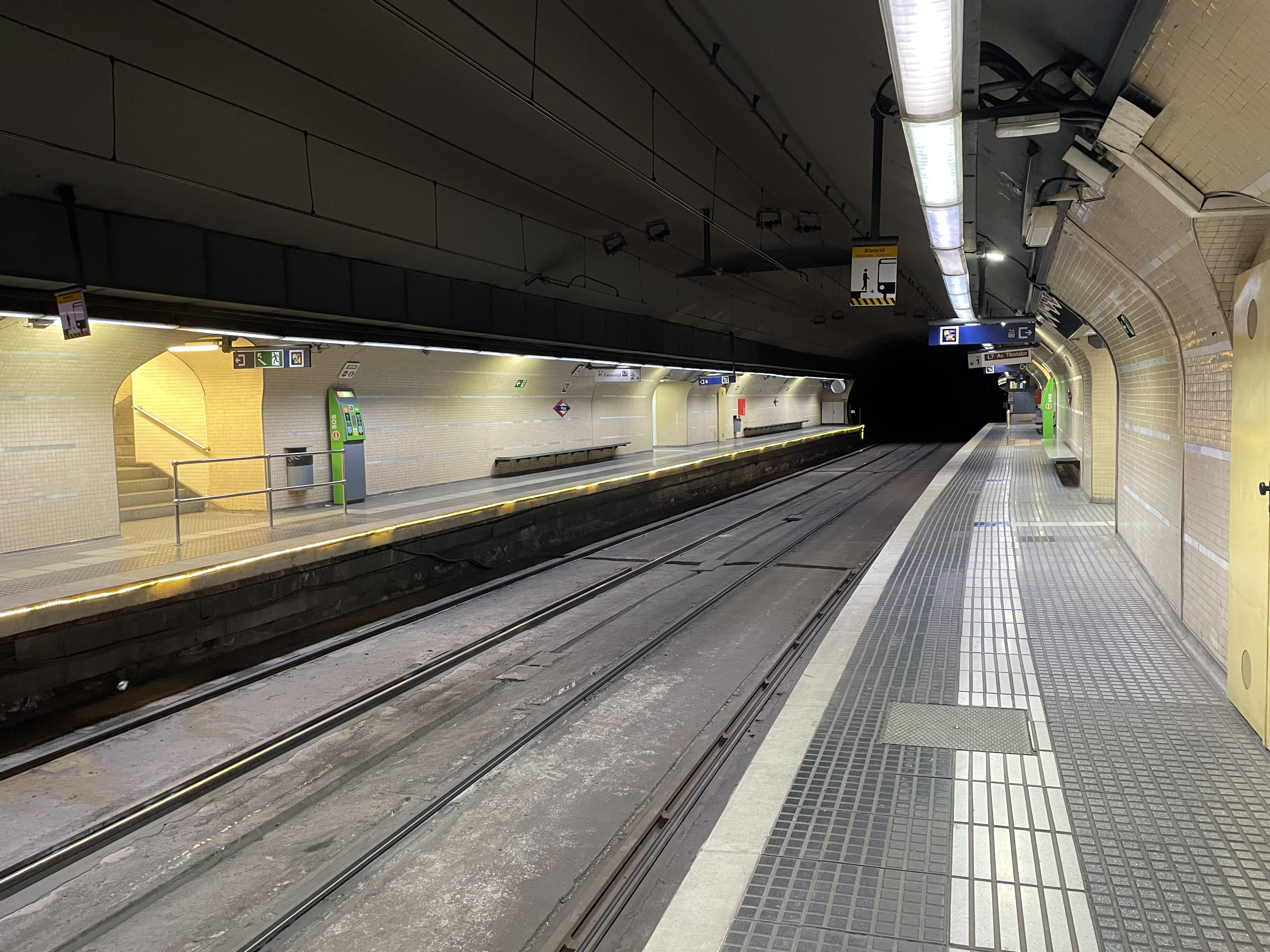

General information
- Location: Carrer de Balmes; Barcelona
- Coordinates: 41°24′12″N 2°08′34″E
- System: Barcelona Metro rapid transit station
- Owner: Ferrocarrils de la Generalitat de Catalunya
- Platforms: 2 side platforms
- Tracks: 2

Construction
- Structure type: Underground

Other information
- Fare zone: 1 (ATM)

History
- Opened: 1953

Passengers
- 2018: 735,984

Services
| Preceding station | FGC | Following station |
|---|---|---|
| Plaça Molina towards Barcelona Pl. Catalunya | L7 | El Putxet towards Av. Tibidabo |
Location

Pàdua (Catalan pronunciation: [ˈpaðu.ə]) is a station of the Barcelona Metro on the FGC-operated line L7 (also known as Línia de Balmes). The station is situated under Carrer de Balmes.

The station opened in 1953 with the opening of the line from Gràcia railway station to Avinguda Tibidabo.

The station has twin tracks, with two 60 metres (200 ft) long side platforms.

== See also ==
- List of Barcelona Metro stations
- List of railway stations in Barcelona
