= Plaça Molina station =

Metro station in Barcelona, Spain

Plaça Molina
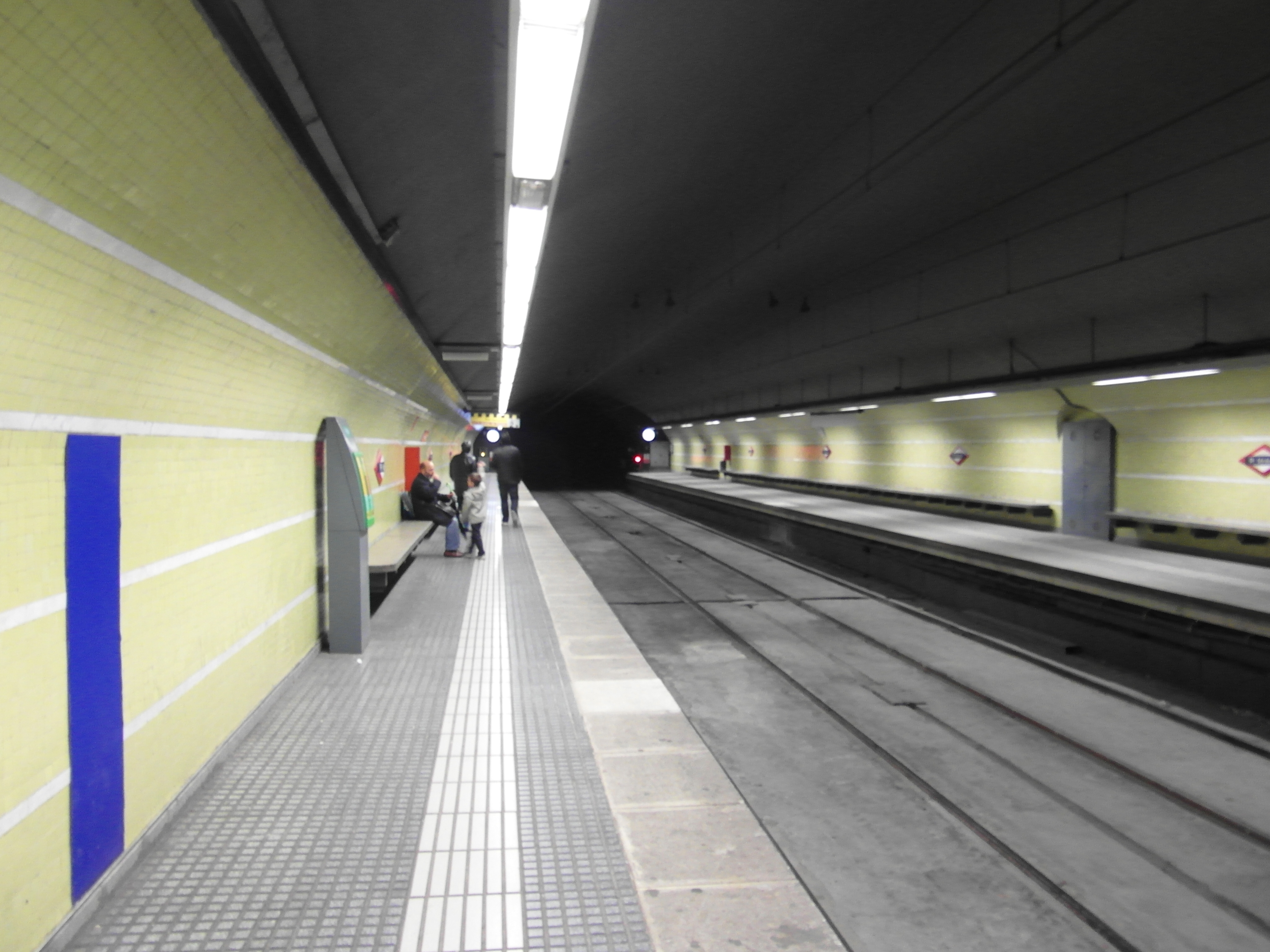

General information
- Location: Plaça Molina; Barcelona
- Coordinates: 41°24′05″N 2°08′51″E
- System: Barcelona Metro rapid transit station
- Owner: Ferrocarrils de la Generalitat de Catalunya
- Platforms: 2 side platforms
- Tracks: 2

Construction
- Structure type: Underground

Other information
- Fare zone: 1 (ATM)

History
- Opened: 1953

Passengers
- 2018: 663,553

Services
Preceding station	FGC	Following station
Gràcia towards Barcelona Pl. Catalunya	L7	Pàdua towards Av. Tibidabo
Location

Plaça Molina (Catalan pronunciation: [ˈplasə muˈlinə]) is a station of the Barcelona Metro on the FGC-operated line L7 (also known as Línia de Balmes). The station is situated under by Plaça Molina, a square in the Sarrià-Sant Gervasi district. It is connected by an underground pedestrian passageway to the nearby Sant Gervasi station on line L6 of the metro.

The station opened in 1953, with the inauguration of the railway section spanning from Gràcia to Avinguda Tibidabo (still the terminus of the line). The link to Sant Gervasi station opened in 2008.

The station has twin tracks, with two 60 metres (200 ft) long side platforms. Because of proximity to street level, each platform has its own street access, with the two platforms being linked by an underpass below the track level.

== See also ==
- List of Barcelona Metro stations
- List of railway stations in Barcelona
