= Plaça de Gal·la Placídia, Barcelona =

Coordinates: 41°23′57″N 2°09′10″E

Plaça de Gal·la Placídia (Catalan pronunciation: [ˈplasə ðə ˈɣalːə pləˈsiði.ə]) is a square split between the districts of Gràcia and Sarrià-Sant Gervasi, in Barcelona, Catalonia, Spain. Its exact location is between Travessera de Gràcia, Carrer de Neptú, Carrer de Milton, Carrer de l'Oreneta and Via Augusta.

It was built on the site of one of the city's many streams. The Mercat de la Llibertat, one of the district's 19th century markets, has been provisionally relocated in this square. There's also a Catholic church and a Mahayana Buddhist centre on it. The Col·legi d'Economistes de Catalunya headquarters are currently under construction on the square, and due to open in 2010.

== Name ==
It's named ultimately after the Roman empress Galla Placidia and, also, after a Catalan Opera based on her life, written in 1913 by Jaume Pahissa. The name was approved in 1940.

== Transport ==
The square is the site of the Ferrocarrils de la Generalitat de Catalunya (FGC) station Gràcia, served by Barcelona Metro lines L6 and L7 and the remainder of Metro del Vallès services.

== See also ==
- List of streets and squares in Gràcia
