= Terrassa Rambla (Barcelona–Vallès Line) =

Railway station in Terrassa, Spain

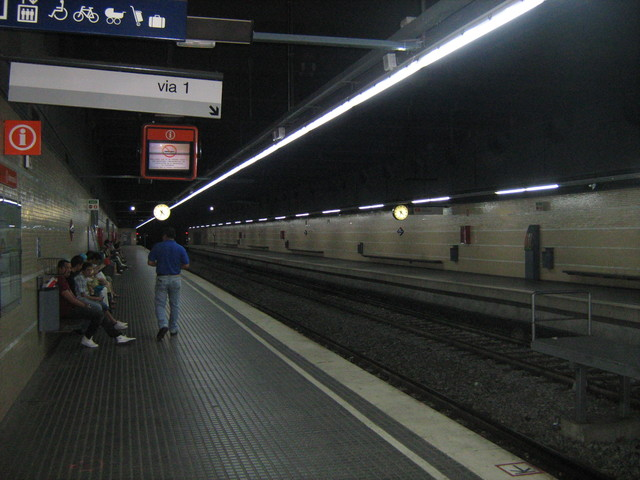

General information
- Location: Spain
- Coordinates: 41°33′38″N 2°0′27″E
- System: commuter station
- Owner: FGC
- Line: S1
- Tracks: 2

Construction
- Structure type: Aboveground

Other information
- Station code: 625
- Fare zone: 2C

History
- Opened: 28 December 1919
- Rebuilt: 1921 (permanent station); 10 March 1987 (underground)

Passengers
- 2018: 1,663,370

Services
Preceding station	FGC	Following station
Les Fonts towards Barcelona Pl. Catalunya	S1	Vallparadís Universitat towards Terrassa Nacions Unides
Location
- Location within Catalonia Location within Spain

Terrassa Rambla (Catalan pronunciation: [təˈrasə ˈramblə]) is a railway station of the Ferrocarrils de la Generalitat de Catalunya (FGC) train system in Vallès Occidental in the province of Barcelona, Catalonia, Spain. It is served by FGC line S1. The station is in fare zone 2C.

The current underground station was opened on 10 March 1987, replacing a previous at-grade station from 1921 which in turn replaced a provisional station from 1919.
