= Hospital General (Barcelona–Vallès Line) =

Railway station in Sant Cugat del Vallès, Spain

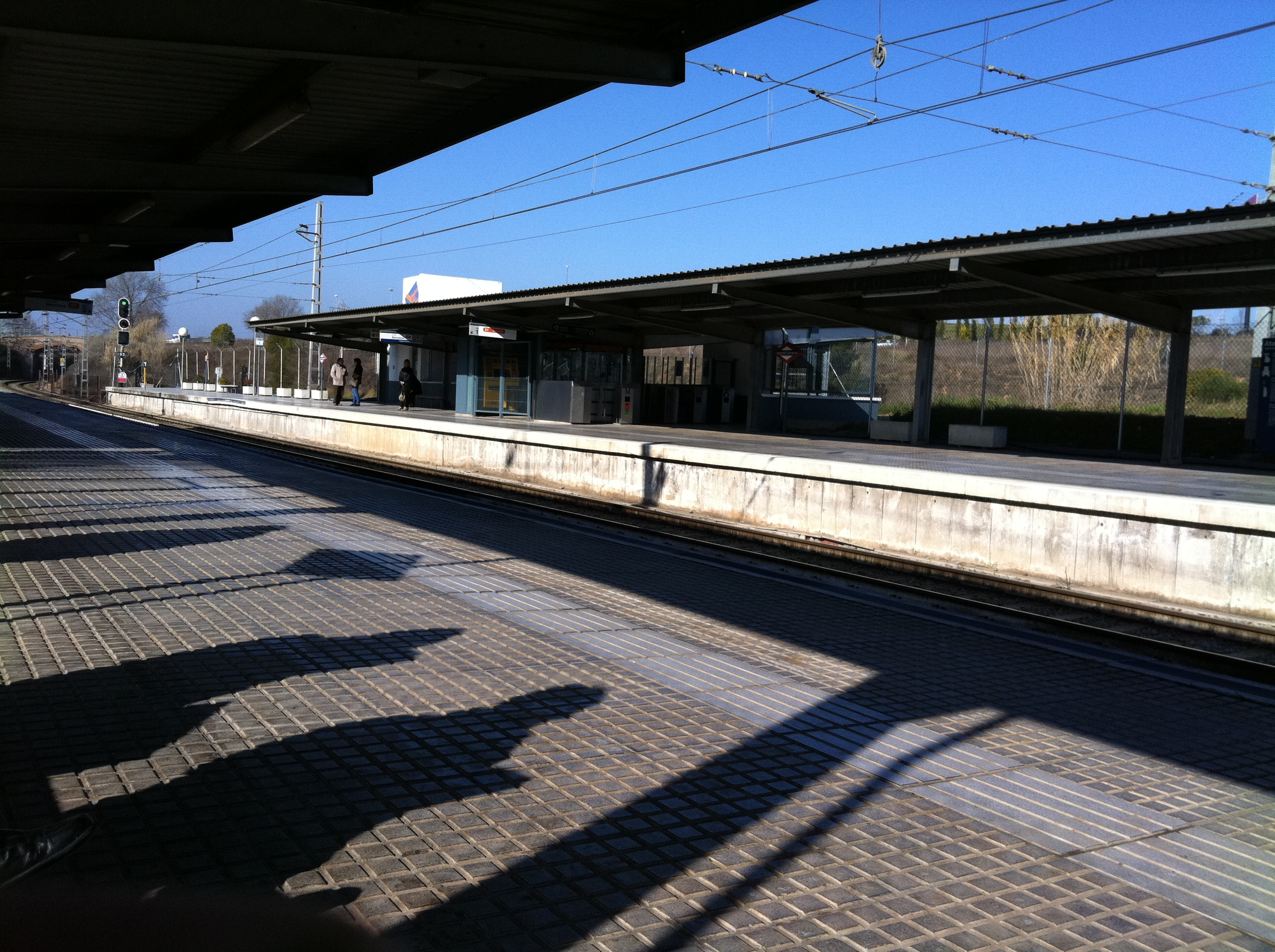

General information
- Location: Spain
- Coordinates: 41°28′34″N 2°02′48″E
- System: commuter station
- Owner: FGC
- Line: S1, S5
- Tracks: 2

Construction
- Structure type: Aboveground

Other information
- Station code: 622
- Fare zone: 2C

History
- Opened: 1985

Passengers
- 2018: 637,009

Services
Preceding station	FGC	Following station
Mira-sol towards Barcelona Pl. Catalunya	S1	Rubí towards Terrassa Nacions Unides
Mira-sol towards Barcelona Pl. Catalunya	S7	Rubí Terminus
Location
- Location within Catalonia Location within Spain

Hospital General (Catalan pronunciation: [uspiˈtal ʒənəˈɾal]) is a railway station of the Ferrocarrils de la Generalitat de Catalunya (FGC) train system in Vallès Occidental in the province of Barcelona, Catalonia, Spain. It is served by FGC lines S1 and S7. The station is in fare zone 2C.

The station is named after the nearby Hospital Universitari General de Catalunya (Translation: General Teaching Hospital of Catalonia), a private hospital in Sant Cugat del Valles.

The station was opened in 1985.

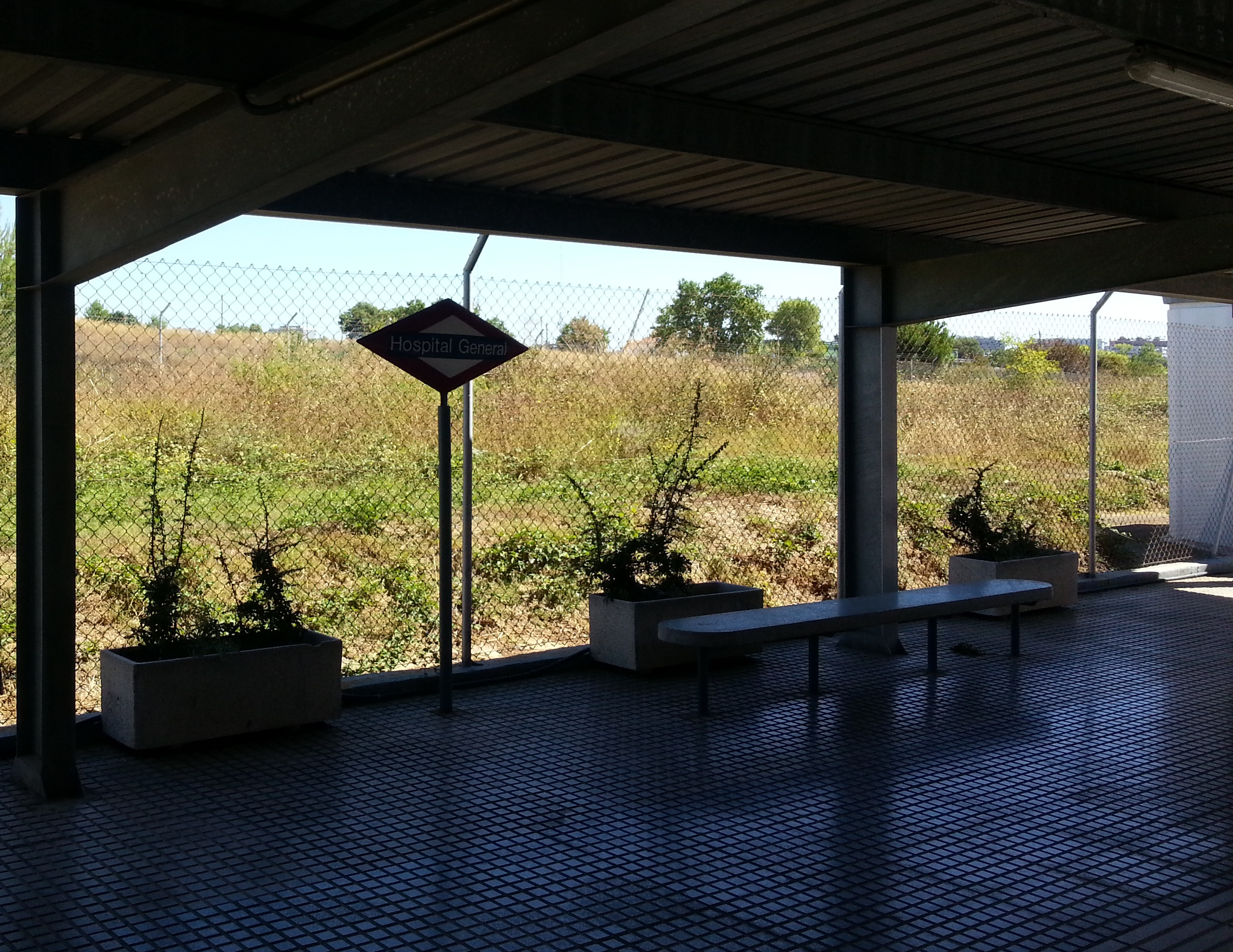
Hospital General station
