= Reina Elisenda =

Metro station in Barcelona, Spain

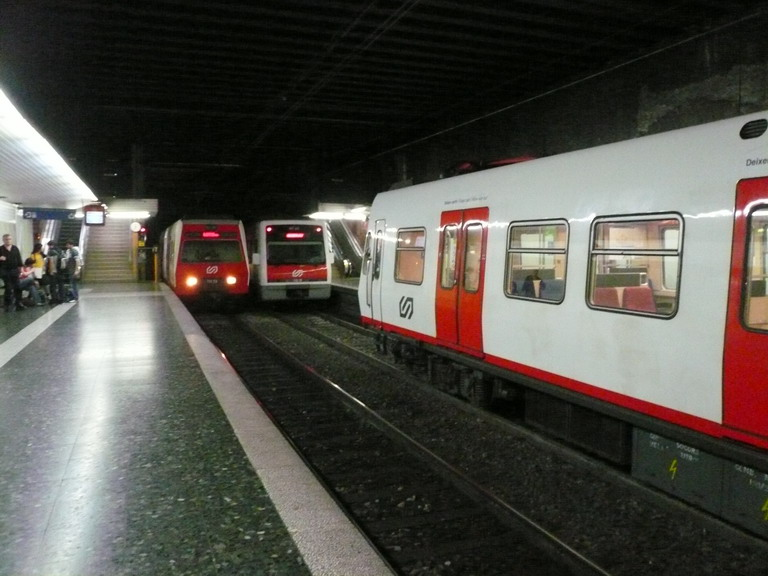
- Reina Elisenda platforms in October 2007, serving as the line's depot at night after the last service

General information
- Location: Passeig de la Reina Elisenda de Montcada; Barcelona
- Coordinates: 41°23′56.73″N 2°7′9.40″E
- System: FGC rapid transit station
- Owner: Ferrocarrils de la Generalitat de Catalunya

Construction
- Structure type: Underground

Other information
- Fare zone: 1 (ATM)

History
- Opened: 5 October 1974
- Rebuilt: 2 October 1976

Passengers
- 2018: 659,637

Services
Preceding station	FGC	Following station
Sarrià Terminus	L12	Terminus
Location

Reina Elisenda (Catalan pronunciation: [ˈrejnə əliˈzendə]) is a railway station on the Barcelona–Vallès Line, in Sarrià, in the Sarrià-Sant Gervasi district of Barcelona. It is the northern terminus and only station of a branch line coming from Sarrià station. Since 2016, a single-track shuttle service, designated L12, links the two stations at four-minute intervals during rush hours due to the modification of Sarrià station to enhance access for persons with reduced mobility; before that, it was served as a branch line of L6.

The station was opened on a provisional basis on 5 October 1974, and on a permanent basis since 2 October 1976, and is situated under Passeig de la Reina Elisenda de Montcada. It can be accessed either from Avinguda de J.V. Foix or Carrer de la Duquessa d'Orleans. At night, it serves as the line's depot.
