= Provença–Diagonal station =

Barcelona Metro station

Provença and Diagonal
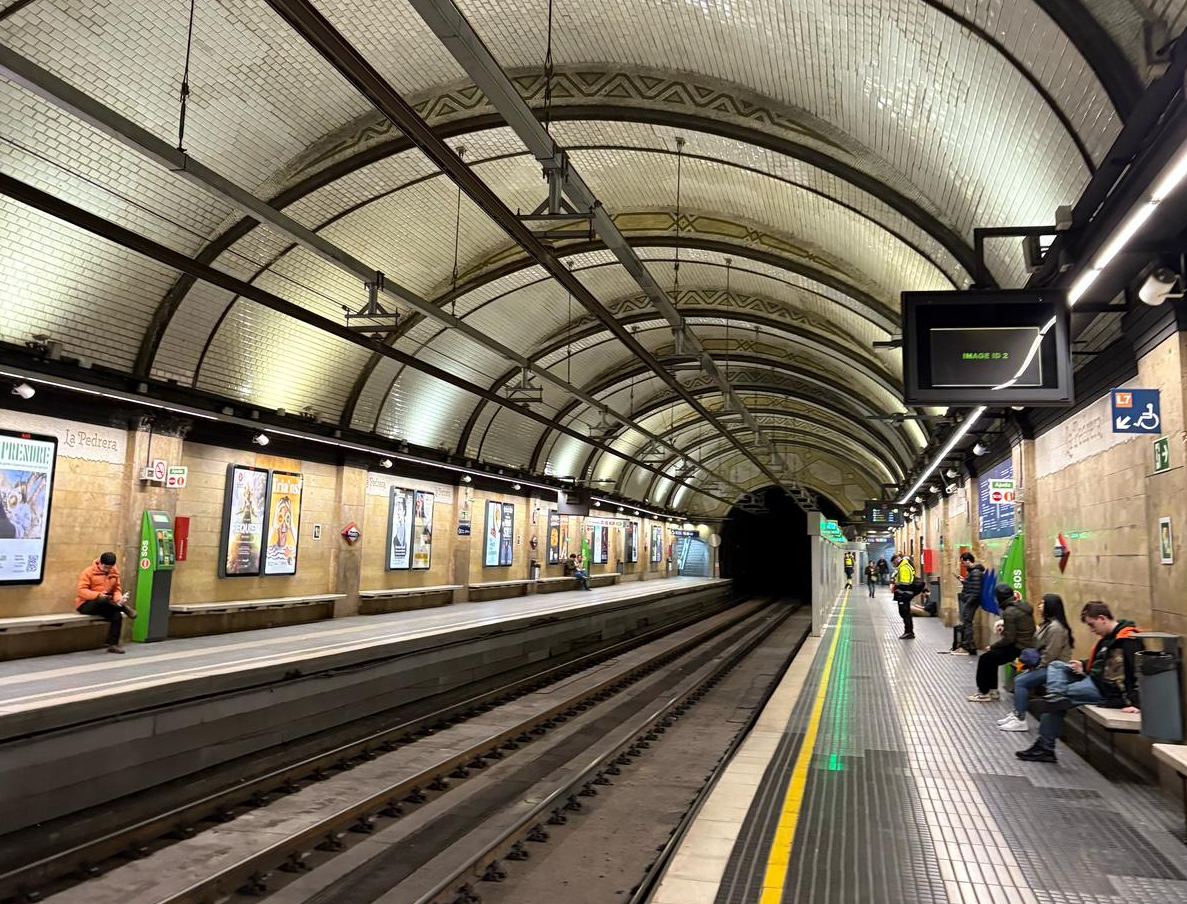
- Platforms of the Barcelona-Vallès line station

General information
- Location: Barcelona (Eixample)
- Coordinates: 41°23′41″N 2°9′35″E
- System: FGC rapid transit station Barcelona Metro rapid transit station
- Owner: TMB and FGC
- Operator: TMB and FGC

Construction
- Structure type: Underground
- Accessible: Yes

Other information
- Fare zone: 1 (ATM)

History
- Opened: 1924 (Line 3); 1929 (Barcelona–Vallès Line); 1969 (Line 5)

Services
Preceding station	FGC	Following station
Barcelona Pl. Catalunya Terminus	L6	Gràcia towards Sarrià
Barcelona Pl. Catalunya Terminus	L7	Gràcia towards Av. Tibidabo
Barcelona Pl. Catalunya Terminus	S1	Gràcia towards Terrassa Nacions Unides
Barcelona Pl. Catalunya Terminus	S2	Gràcia towards Sabadell Parc del Nord
Preceding station	Metro	Following station
Passeig de Gràcia towards Zona Universitària	L3	Fontana towards Trinitat Nova
Hospital Clínic towards Cornellà Centre	L5	Verdaguer towards Vall d'Hebron
Location
- Location within Barcelona

Provença (Catalan pronunciation: [pɾuˈβɛnsə]) and Diagonal (Catalan pronunciation: [di.əɣuˈnal]) are two connected rapid transit stations that form a major transport hub in Barcelona's Eixample district. Provença is served by the FGC-operated Line 6 and Line 7 of the Barcelona Metro and the suburban rail lines S1 and S2 of the Barcelona-Vallès Line. Diagonal is an important interchange station of the TMB-operated Barcelona Metro network, served by Line 3 and Line 5.

The underground station complex spans beneath several major streets, including Rambla de Catalunya, Passeig de Gràcia and Carrer de Balmes. These streets intersect both Avinguda Diagonal and Carrer de Provença, after which the stations are named.

Diagonal was the second most used station of the TMB-operated Barcelona Metro lines in 2024, with over 16 million passengers.

== Location ==
The station's three sets of platforms are connected by an underground corridor under Carrer de Rosselló.

=== Provença ===
The FGC station is physically located beneath Carrer de Balmes, between the streets of Provença and Rosselló. The station features an entrance hall with fare gates at each end of the platforms, with two accesses to either side of Carrer de Balmes in each of them. The station hall on the Rosselló side features the connection corridor to the TMB-operated metro lines, with Line 5 being closer.

=== Diagonal ===
The Line 5 platforms are located beneath Carrer del Rosselló, in the intersection with Rambla de Catalunya. The connection corridor between the different lines runs over Line 5's platforms and links the station's fare gates and entrance halls. The station has two accesses, one on each side of Rambla de Catalunya.

The Line 3 platforms are located beneath Passeig de Gràcia, between Rosselló and Avinguda Diagonal (a space commonly known as Cinc d'Oros). The station features two entrance halls, one at each end of the platforms, with entrances on either side of Passeig de Gràcia. The station hall on the Rosselló side features the connection corridor to the other lines, with Line 5 being closer.

== History ==
=== Provença ===
Provença originally opened as an infill station of the Tren de Sarrià on August 18, 1882. The line had been in service since 1863 and crossed the streets of Barcelona at grade, with the right of way along Carrer de Balmes. As the population of the Eixample district grew in the 1870s, construction of a station by the intersection with Carrer de Provença was considered by the line's operator, Ferrocarril de Sarrià a Barcelona. The station project was initially presented in 1876.

As traffic on the line grew, the city council and operator reached an agreement to rebuild the line's urban section in Barcelona as an underground line. Works began in 1926 and Provença was inaugurated as a rebuilt underground station on March 27, 1929. The station entered service on April 27, shortly before the 1929 Barcelona International Exposition was held in the city. The underground station was built on the same site as the original surface station, with a single access in Carrer de Provença.

As the Line 5 station was opened in 1969, a new access was built in Carrer de Rosselló to connect Provença to the Barcelona Metro stations. The station was refurbished in 1983, as Ferrocarrils de la Generalitat de Catalunya took over operation of the Barcelona-Vallès line. The station's platforms were expanded in 1995 to allow for longer trains. The connection corridor with the Barcelona Metro lines was expanded between 2005 and 2009 to allow for the installation of moving walkways.

In 2003, platform screen doors were installed in part of the platform for Sarrià-bound trains, in an attempt to alleviate the overcrowding problems in the station. The platform screen doors only work during peak hours. The station's wall was excavated in 2019 to further expand the platform and deal with the overcrowding issue.

=== Diagonal ===
- The Line 3 station opened in 1924 as part of the initial section of the Gran Metropolitano de Barcelona, the first Barcelona Metro line. The station's original name was Diagonal-Paseo de Gracia, although it was frequently simplified to Diagonal on official signage and diagrams. The name was officially changed to the current Diagonal with the system-wide reorganization in 1982. A new station access was built in 1969 to connect to the Line 5 station and to Provença. The station was refurbished in 2009, as part of the renovation works to improve connection between the different lines in the transport hub.
- The Line 5 station was opened in 1969, originally with the name Rambla de Cataluña. It was the initial terminus of a new line that ran from Collblanc. In 1970, the line was extended towards La Sagrera, where it was connected to an existing branch line to form Line 5. In 1982, the station's name was changed to the current Diagonal, matching the Line 3 station.

=== Future Tram connection ===
The final stretch of the planned Barcelona Tram extension along Avinguda Diagonal features a new stop in the intersection with Passeig de Gràcia. The stop's tentative name is 'Diagonal | Cinc d'Oros'. The 2 kilometer stretch would link the currently unconnected Trambesòs and Trambaix networks.

The Barcelona City Council has announced plans to divide the project in two phases, with the first phase reaching the Diagonal | Cinc d'Oros stop. Current plans to renovate Avinguda Diagonal prior to the project's start wouldn't allow for the Tram to reach Passeig de Gràcia before 2027.

== Gallery ==
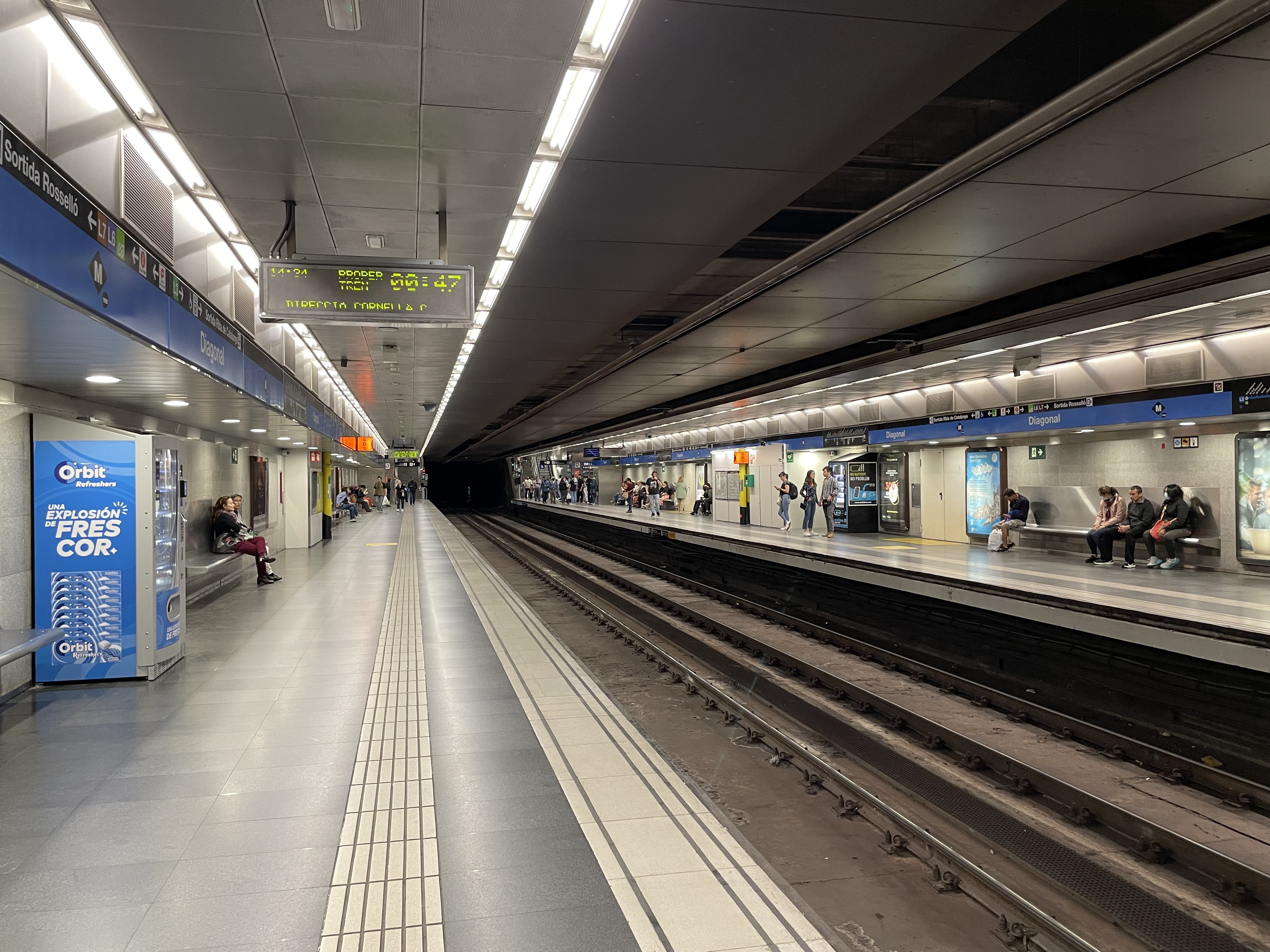
Platforms of Line 5

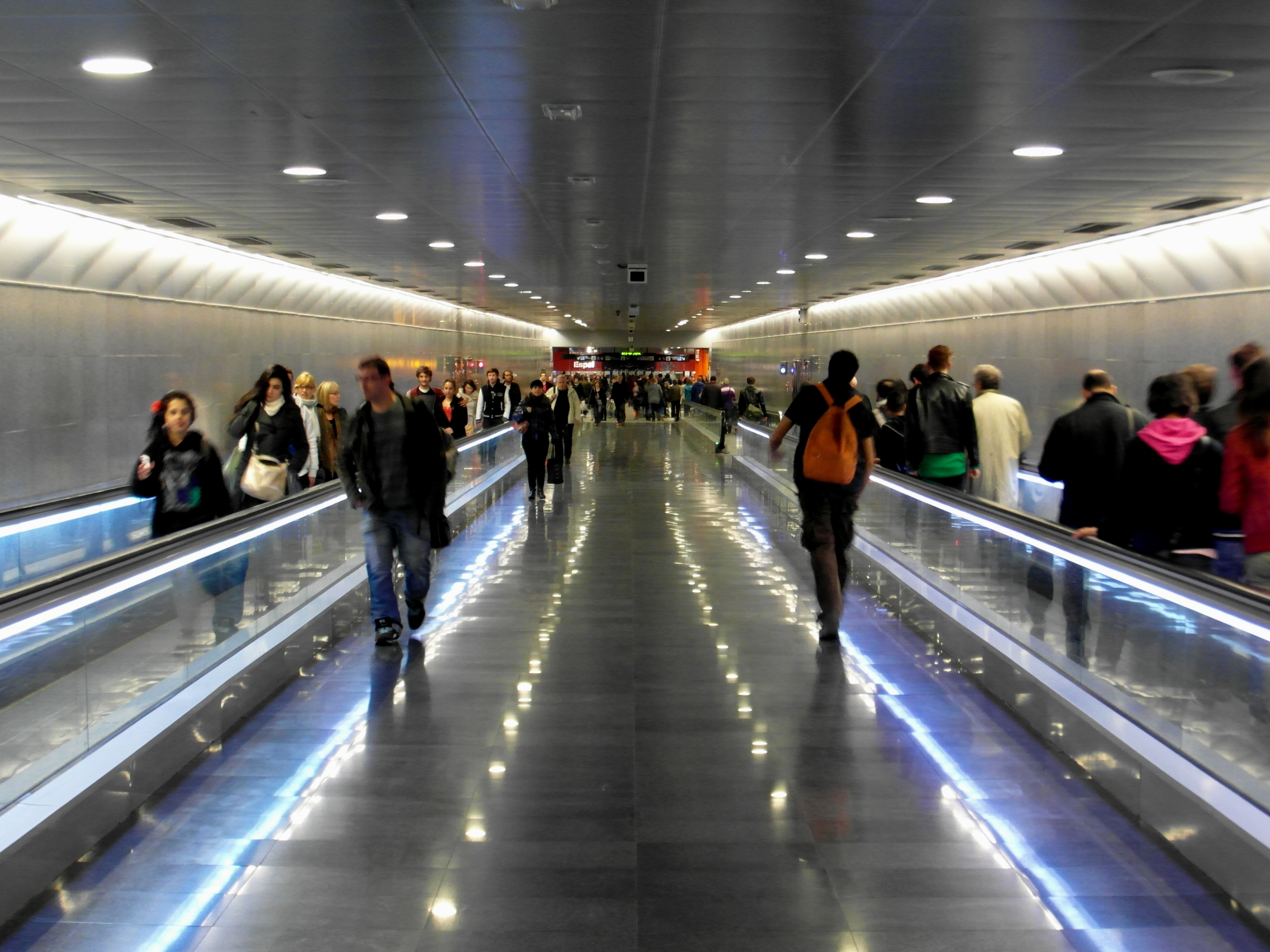
The connection corridor between Line 3, Line 5 and the FGC station

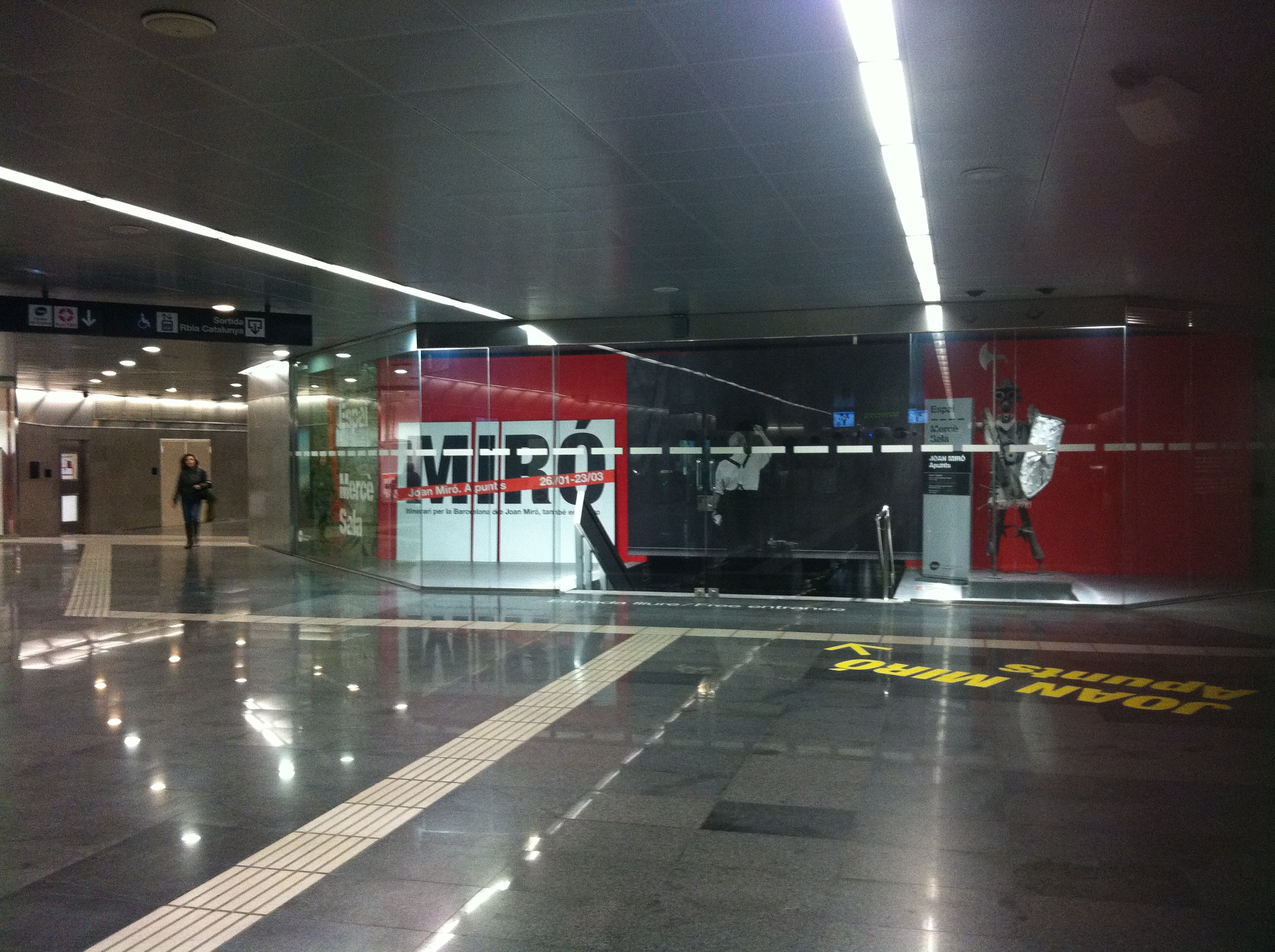
Espai Mercè Sala, an exhibition hall found inside the connection corridor

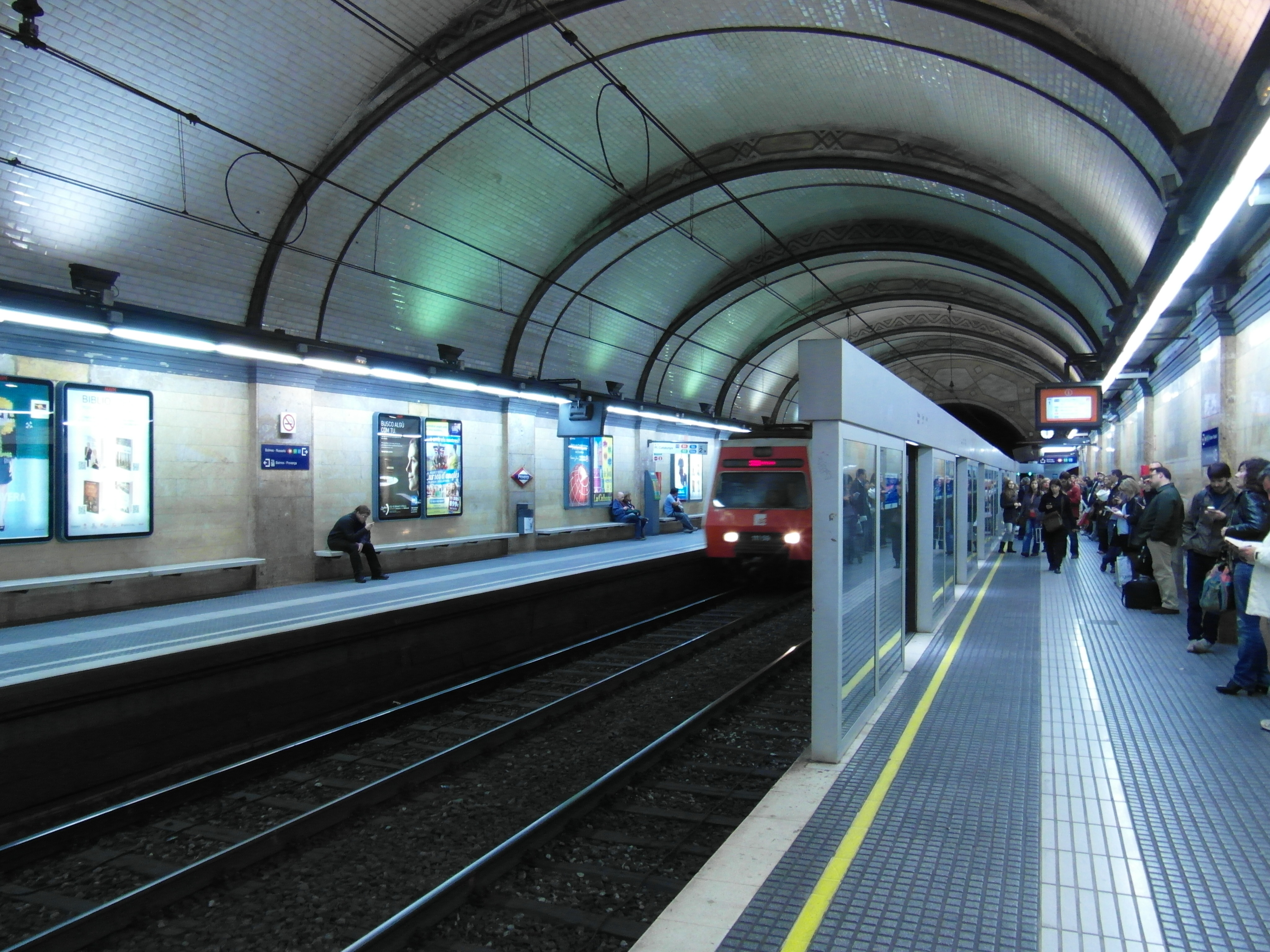
The platform screen doors visible at the FGC platform

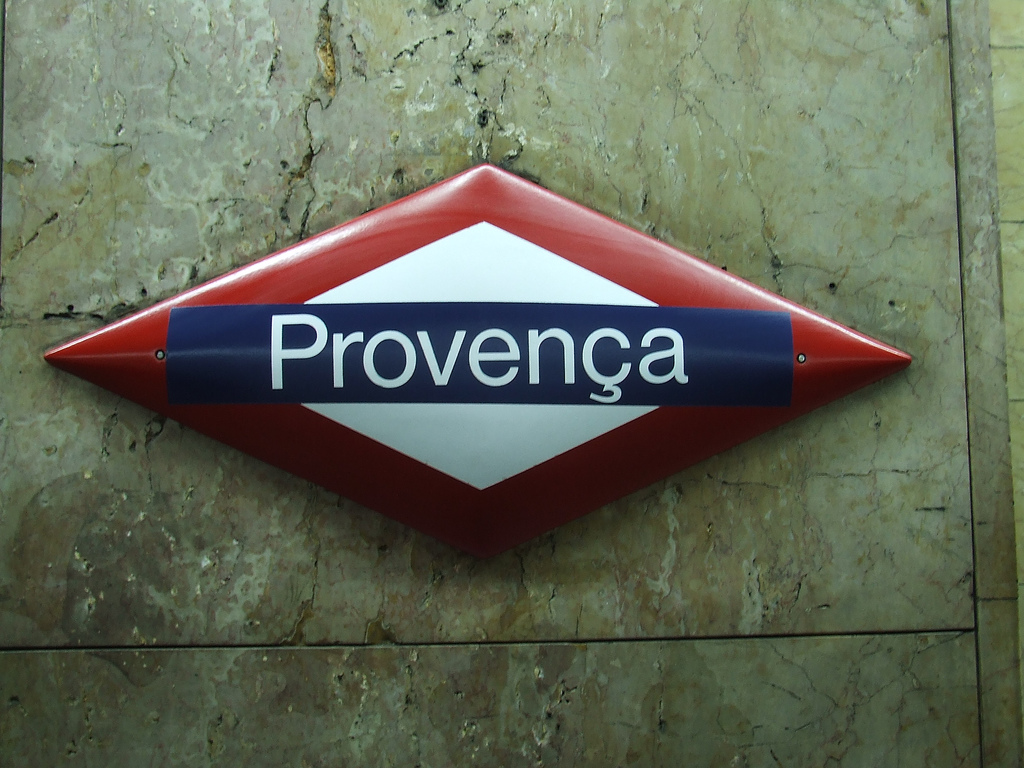
The FGC station sign at Provença

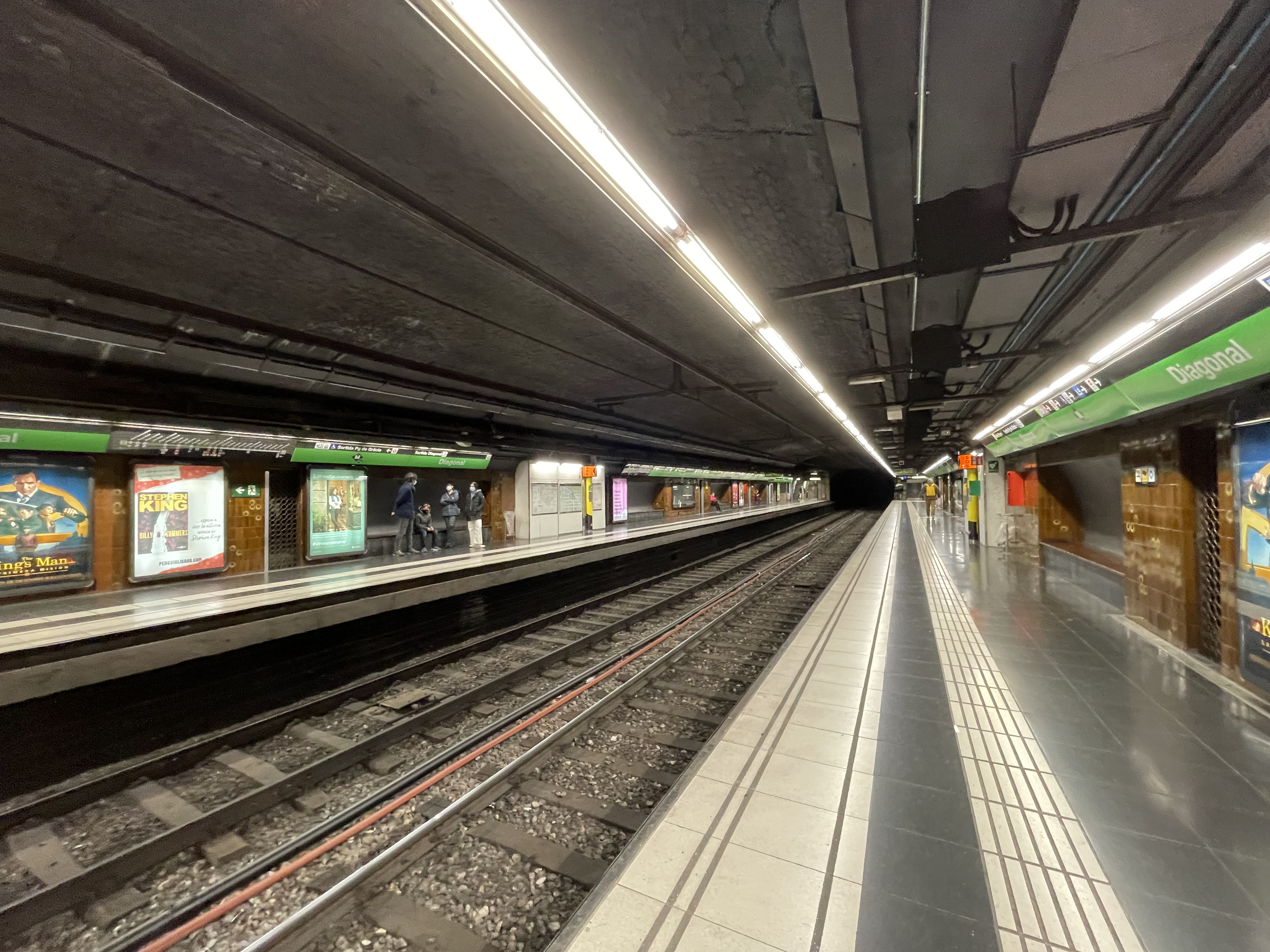
Platforms of Line 3

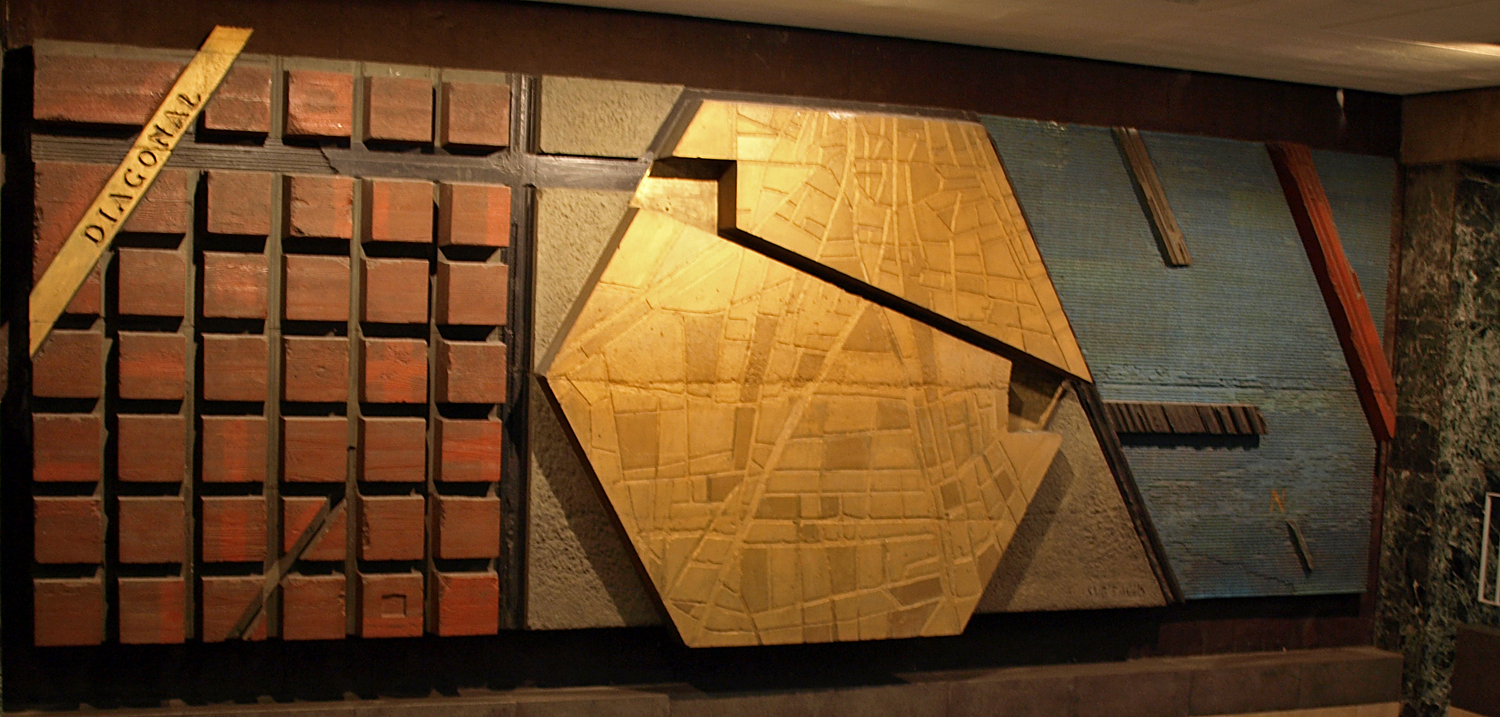
A mural by Josep Maria Subirachs at Line 3's station hall
