= List of railway stations in Barcelona =

This is a complete list of Renfe and Ferrocarrils de la Generalitat de Catalunya-operated railway stations in Barcelona, sorted alphabetically, excluding Barcelona Metro stations. It only includes stations strictly located within the municipality of Barcelona proper (as opposed to the metropolitan area of Barcelona).

== Stations ==
Name	District	Operator	Barcelona Metro connection
Arc de Triomf	Eixample	Renfe	Arc de Triomf
Avinguda Tibidabo	Sarrià-Sant Gervasi	FGC	
El Clot-Aragó	Sant Martí	Renfe	Clot
El Morrot goods station	Sants-Montjuïc	Renfe	
El Putxet	Sarrià-Sant Gervasi	FGC	
Plaça d'Espanya	Sants-Montjuïc	FGC	Espanya
Estació de França	Ciutat Vella	Renfe	Barceloneta
Gràcia	Gràcia	FGC	
Ildefons Cerdà	Sants-Montjuïc	FGC	
La Bonanova	Sarrià-Sant Gervasi	FGC	
Les Planes	Sarrià-Sant Gervasi	FGC	
Les Tres Torres	Sarrià-Sant Gervasi	FGC	
Magòria-La Campana	Sants-Montjuïc	FGC	
Muntaner	Sarrià-Sant Gervasi	FGC	
Pàdua	Sarrià-Sant Gervasi	FGC	
Passeig de Gràcia	Eixample	Renfe	Passeig de Gràcia
Peu del Funicular	Sarrià-Sant Gervasi	FGC	
Plaça de Catalunya	Eixample	Renfe, FGC	Catalunya
Plaça Molina	Sarrià-Sant Gervasi	FGC	
Provença	Eixample	FGC	Diagonal
Reina Elisenda	Sarrià-Sant Gervasi	FGC	
Sant Andreu Arenal	Sant Andreu	Renfe	Fabra i Puig
Sant Andreu Comtal	Sant Andreu	Renfe	Sant Andreu
Sant Gervasi	Sarrià-Sant Gervasi	FGC	
Sants	Sants-Montjuïc	Renfe	Sants Estació
Sarrià	Sarrià-Sant Gervasi	FGC	Sarrià
Torre del Baró	Nou Barris	Renfe	Torre Baró-Vallbona

== Future stations ==
Name	District	Operator	Barcelona Metro connection
Estació de la Sagrera	Sant Andreu	Renfe	Sagrera-TAV
Glòries	Sant Martí	Renfe, FGC	Glòries

== Former stations ==
Name	District	Operator	Barcelona Metro connection
Bifurcació Vilanova	Eixample	Renfe	Barcelona Metro line 1 (Marina station)
Bogatell	Sant Martí	Renfe	Roughly current Bogatell metro station
Estació del Nord	Eixample	Renfe	Norte-Triunfo (Arc de Triomf)
Clot-Sagrera	Sant Andreu	Renfe	
Poblenou	Sant Martí	Renfe	Roughly current Poblenou metro station

== See also ==
- Transport in Barcelona
- List of Rodalies Barcelona railway stations
- List of Barcelona Metro stations
- List of tram stations in Barcelona
