= Muntaner station =

Railway station in Barcelona, Spain

Muntaner
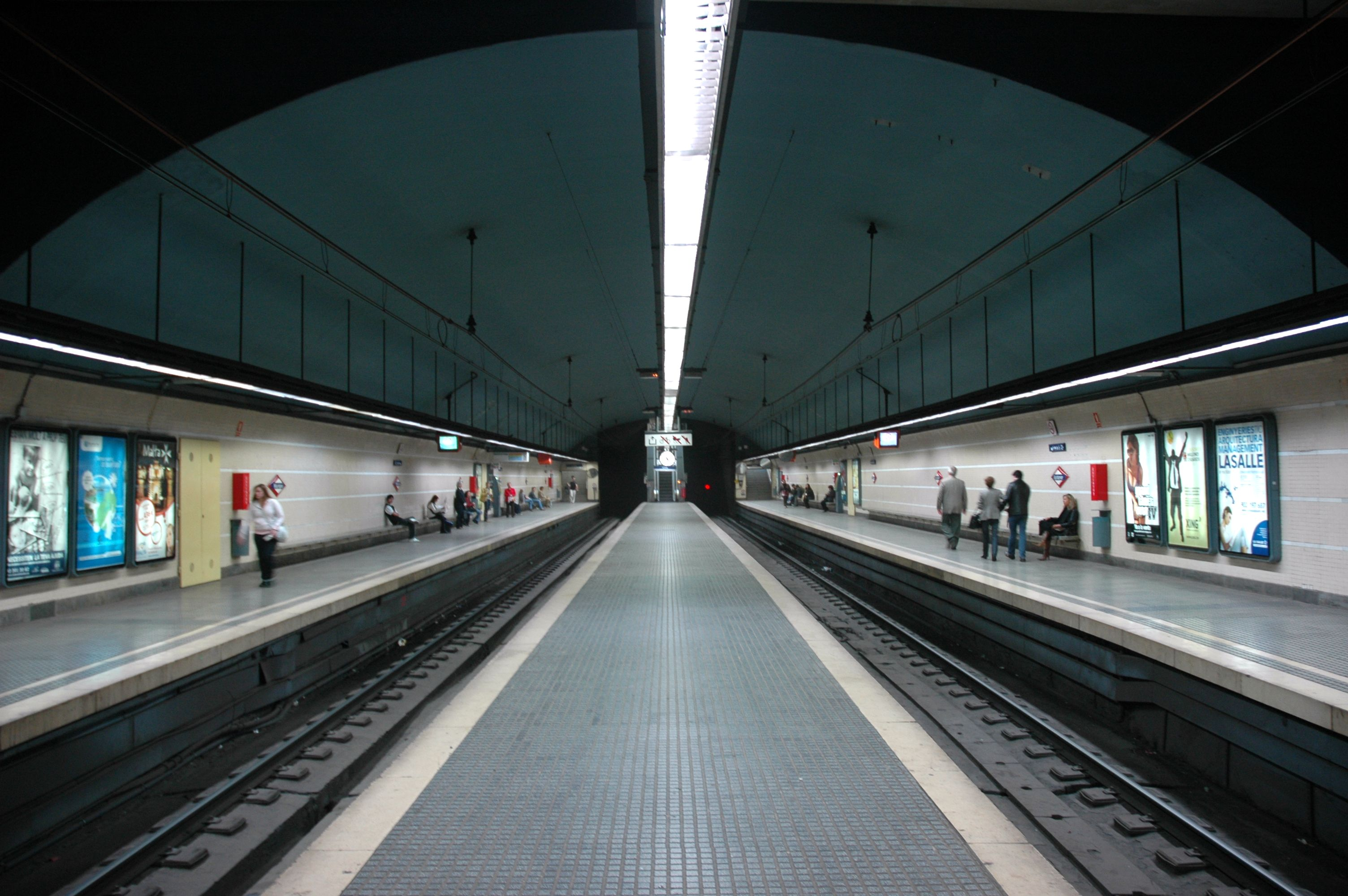

General information
- Location: Via Augusta, Barcelona
- Coordinates: 41°23′55″N 2°08′34″E
- System: Barcelona Metro rapid transit station Metro del Vallès commuter rail station
- Owner: Ferrocarrils de la Generalitat de Catalunya
- Platforms: 4 (in Barcelona solution configuration)
- Tracks: 2

Construction
- Structure type: Underground

Other information
- Fare zone: 1 (ATM)

History
- Opened: 1908
- Rebuilt: 1959

Passengers
- 2018: 2,822,251

Services
| Preceding station | FGC | Following station |
|---|---|---|
| Sant Gervasi towards Barcelona Pl. Catalunya | L6 | La Bonanova towards Sarrià |
| Sant Gervasi towards Barcelona Pl. Catalunya | S1 | La Bonanova towards Terrassa Nacions Unides |
| Sant Gervasi towards Barcelona Pl. Catalunya | S2 | La Bonanova towards Sabadell Parc del Nord |
Location

Muntaner (Catalan pronunciation: [muntəˈne]) is a railway station located at the intersection of the Via Augusta with the Carrer de Santaló and Carrer de Muntaner, in the Sarrià-Sant Gervasi district of Barcelona. It is served by line L6 of the Barcelona Metro, together with lines S1 and S2 of the Metro del Vallès commuter rail system. All these lines are operated by Ferrocarrils de la Generalitat de Catalunya, who also run the station.

The station has twin tracks, with two side platforms and a central island platform. The side platforms are used for boarding, whilst the central platform is used for alighting, a configuration that is known as the Barcelona solution.

The line on which Muntaner station is located opened in 1863, but the first station on the site did not open until 1908. The current station was opened in 1959, when the line through the station was put underground.
