= Les Fonts (Barcelona–Vallès Line) =

Railway station in Barcelona, Spain

General information
- Location: Les Fonts, Vallès Occidental, Barcelona, Catalonia; Spain
- Coordinates: 41°31′42″N 2°02′0″E
- System: commuter station
- Owner: FGC
- Line: S1
- Tracks: 2

Construction
- Structure type: Aboveground

Other information
- Station code: 624
- Fare zone: 2C

History
- Opened: 1920

Passengers
- 2018: 410,279

Services
Preceding station	FGC	Following station
Rubí towards Barcelona Pl. Catalunya	S1	Terrassa Rambla towards Terrassa Nacions Unides
Location
- Location within Catalonia Location within Spain

Les Fonts (Catalan pronunciation: [ləs ˈfɔns]) is a railway station of the Ferrocarrils de la Generalitat de Catalunya (FGC) train system in Les Fonts, Vallès Occidental in the province of Barcelona, Catalonia, Spain. It is served by FGC line S1. The station is in fare zone 2C.

The station was opened in 1920.
