= Rubí (Barcelona–Vallès Line) =

Railway station in Catalonia, Spain

Rubí Centre
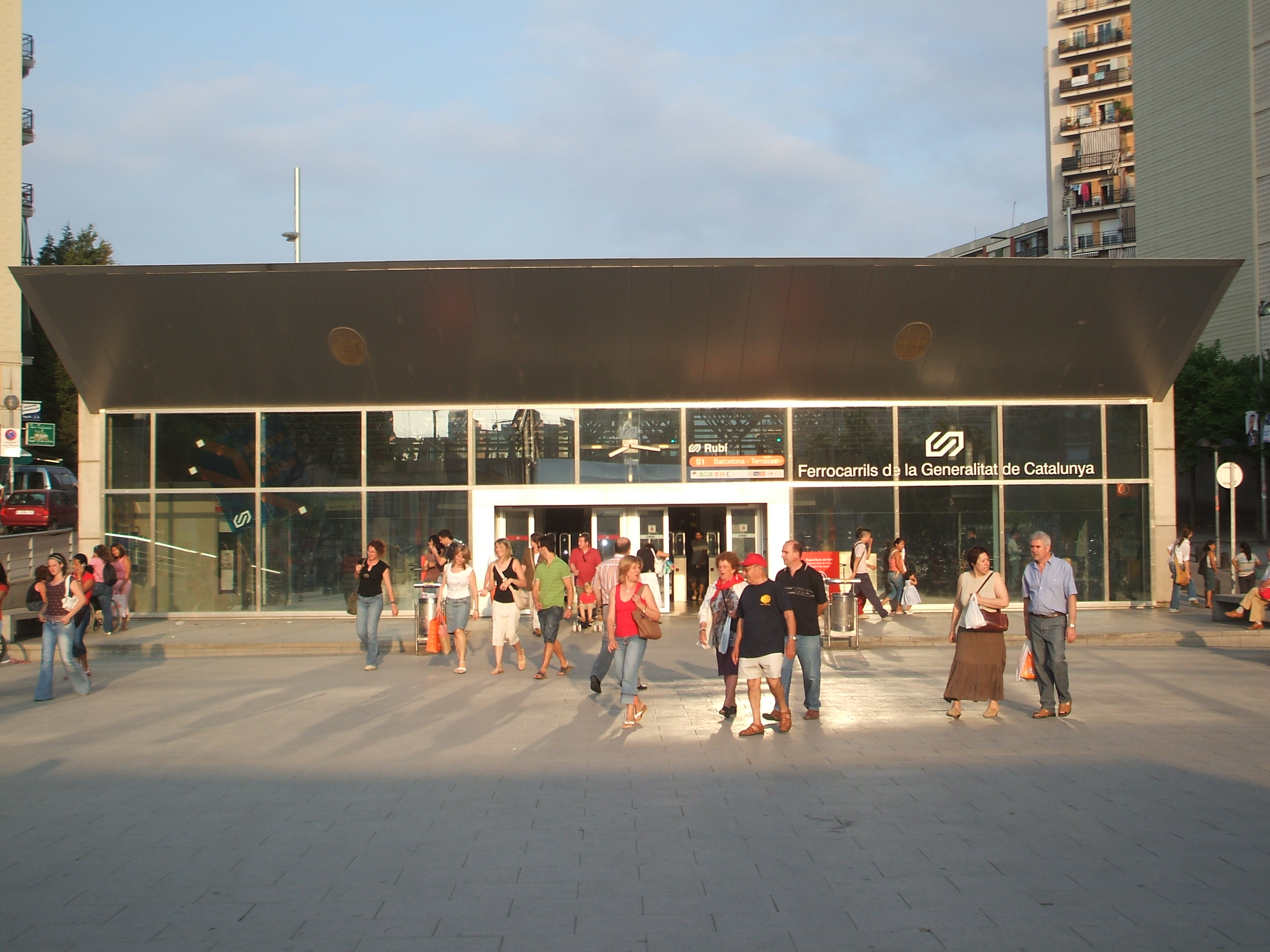

General information
- Location: Rubí, Vallès Occidental, Barcelona Province
- Coordinates: 41°29′11″N 2°01′53″E
- System: commuter station
- Owner: FGC
- Line: S1
- Tracks: 2

Construction
- Structure type: Above ground

Other information
- Station code: 623
- Fare zone: 2C

History
- Opened: 1918
- Rebuilt: 1993

Passengers
- 2018: 2,597,897

Services
Preceding station	FGC	Following station
Hospital General towards Barcelona Pl. Catalunya	S1	Les Fonts towards Terrassa Nacions Unides
Location
- Location within Catalonia Location within Spain

Rubí Centre (Catalan pronunciation: [ruˈβi]) is a railway station of the Ferrocarrils de la Generalitat de Catalunya (FGC) train system in Rubí, Barcelona Province, Catalonia. It is served by FGC line S1. The station is in fare zone 2C.

The station was opened in 1918 and rebuilt in 1993.

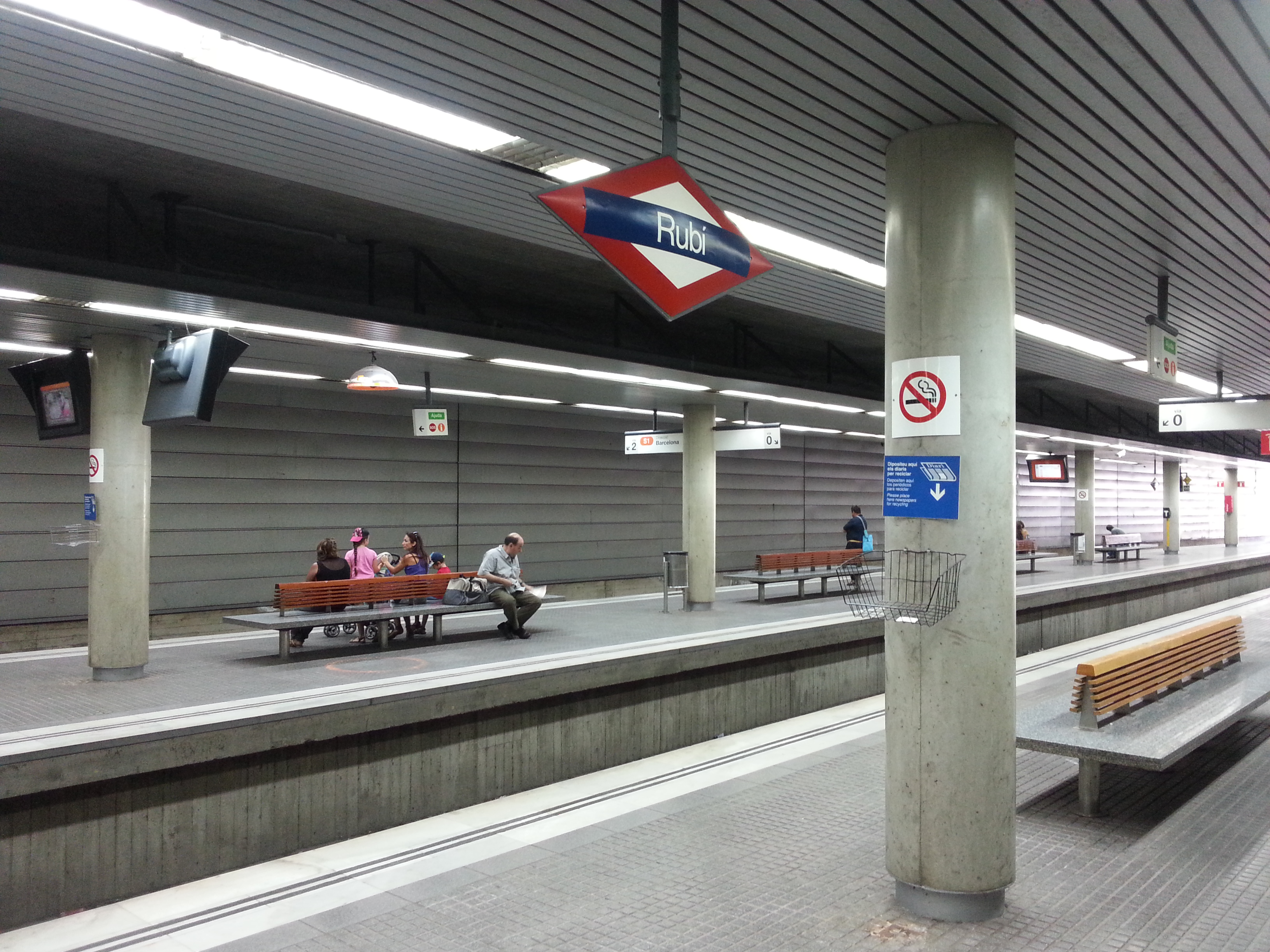
Rubí station
