= Gràcia station =

Metro station in Barcelona, Spain

Gràcia
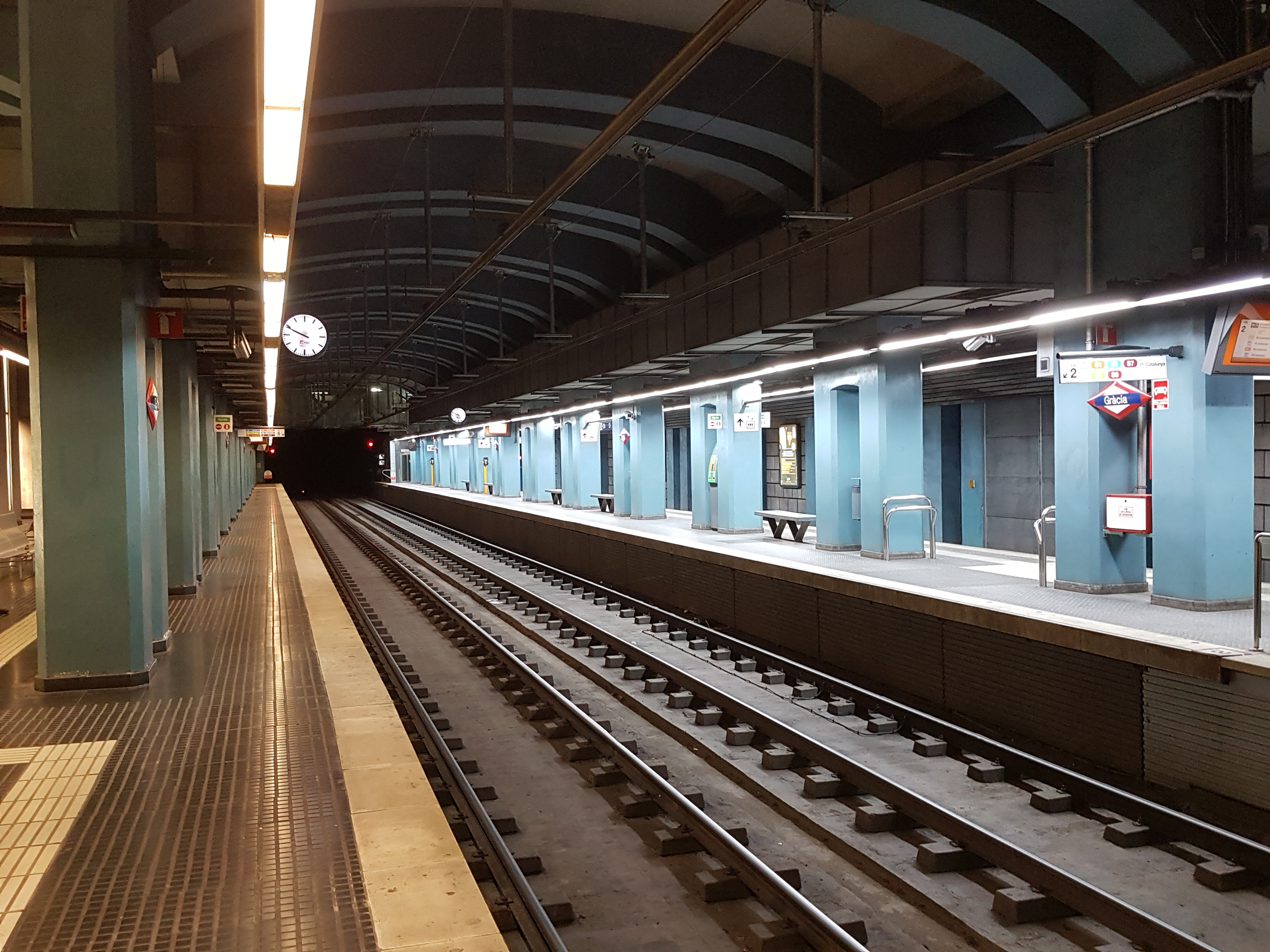

General information
- Location: Plaça de Gal·la Placídia; Barcelona
- Coordinates: 41°23′58.4″N 2°09′07.8″E
- System: Barcelona Metro rapid transit station Metro del Vallès commuter rail station
- Owner: FGC
- Operator: FGC
- Platforms: 2
- Tracks: 4

Construction
- Structure type: Underground
- Cycle facilities: yes
- Accessible: yes

Other information
- Fare zone: 1 (ATM)

Passengers
- 2018: 3,608,764

Services
Preceding station	FGC	Following station
Provença towards Barcelona Pl. Catalunya	L6	Sant Gervasi towards Sarrià
Provença towards Barcelona Pl. Catalunya	L7	Pl. Molina towards Av. Tibidabo
Provença towards Barcelona Pl. Catalunya	S1	Sant Gervasi towards Terrassa Nacions Unides
Provença towards Barcelona Pl. Catalunya	S2	Sant Gervasi towards Sabadell Parc del Nord
Location
- Location within Barcelona

Gràcia (Catalan pronunciation: [ˈɡɾasi.ə]) is a railway station located under Plaça de Gal·la Placídia in the Gràcia district of Barcelona. It is served both by lines L6 and L7 of the Barcelona Metro, and by lines S1 and S2 of the Metro del Vallès commuter rail system. All these lines are operated by Ferrocarrils de la Generalitat de Catalunya, who also run the station.

== Location ==
The two sets of platforms are located beneath Plaça de Gal·la Placídia on the Via Augusta, between Carrer de Marià Cubí and Travessera de Gràcia. The station has two accesses, one on each side of the square.

== History ==
Gràcia was made subterranean on 24 April, 1929. In 1954, the line to Avinguda Tibidabo began to service the station.

In 2012, the platform for tracks 1-3 was extended to 10.5 metres, and in 2013 the third track was modified to be accessible.

=== Future L8 Connection ===
The station will serve as the terminus for the L8 of the Llobregat–Anoia Line, which will be extended from Espanya. The extension is currently under construction.

== See also ==
- List of Barcelona Metro stations
- List of railway stations in Barcelona
