= Sant Gervasi station =

Railway station in Barcelona, Spain

Sant Gervasi
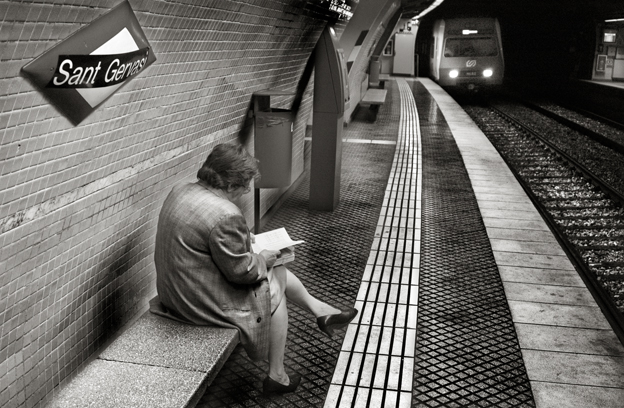

General information
- Location: Plaça Molina; Barcelona
- Coordinates: 41°24′04″N 2°08′50″E
- System: Barcelona Metro rapid transit station Metro del Vallès commuter rail station
- Owner: Ferrocarrils de la Generalitat de Catalunya
- Platforms: 2 side platforms
- Tracks: 2

Construction
- Structure type: Underground

Other information
- Fare zone: 1 (ATM)

History
- Opened: 1863
- Rebuilt: 1929

Passengers
- 2018: 630,737

Services
Preceding station	FGC	Following station
Gràcia towards Barcelona Pl. Catalunya	L6	Muntaner towards Sarrià
Gràcia towards Barcelona Pl. Catalunya	S1	Muntaner towards Terrassa Nacions Unides
Gràcia towards Barcelona Pl. Catalunya	S2	Muntaner towards Sabadell Parc del Nord
Location

Sant Gervasi (Catalan pronunciation: [ˌsaɲ ʒərˈbazi]) is a railway station located under Plaça Molina in the Sarrià-Sant Gervasi district of Barcelona. It is served by line L6 of the Barcelona Metro and lines S1 and S2 of the Metro del Vallès commuter rail system,. All these lines are operated by Ferrocarrils de la Generalitat de Catalunya, who also run the station.

The station has twin tracks, with two 80 metres (260 ft) long side platforms. It is located close to Plaça Molina station, on metro line L7. The two stations are connected by a pedestrian tunnel, within the fare paid area of both stations.

Due to the renovations at the Gràcia station, commuters wishing to take the L7 line to Avinguda Tibidabo must access it by switching from Sant Gervasi to Plaça Molina.

The first Sant Gervasi station opened in 1863 and was situated in a cutting with a station building at ground level. The current station was opened in 1929, when the line serving the station was put underground.

== See also ==
- List of Barcelona Metro stations
- List of railway stations in Barcelona
