= Les Fonts =

Coordinates: 41°31′39″N 2°02′09″E

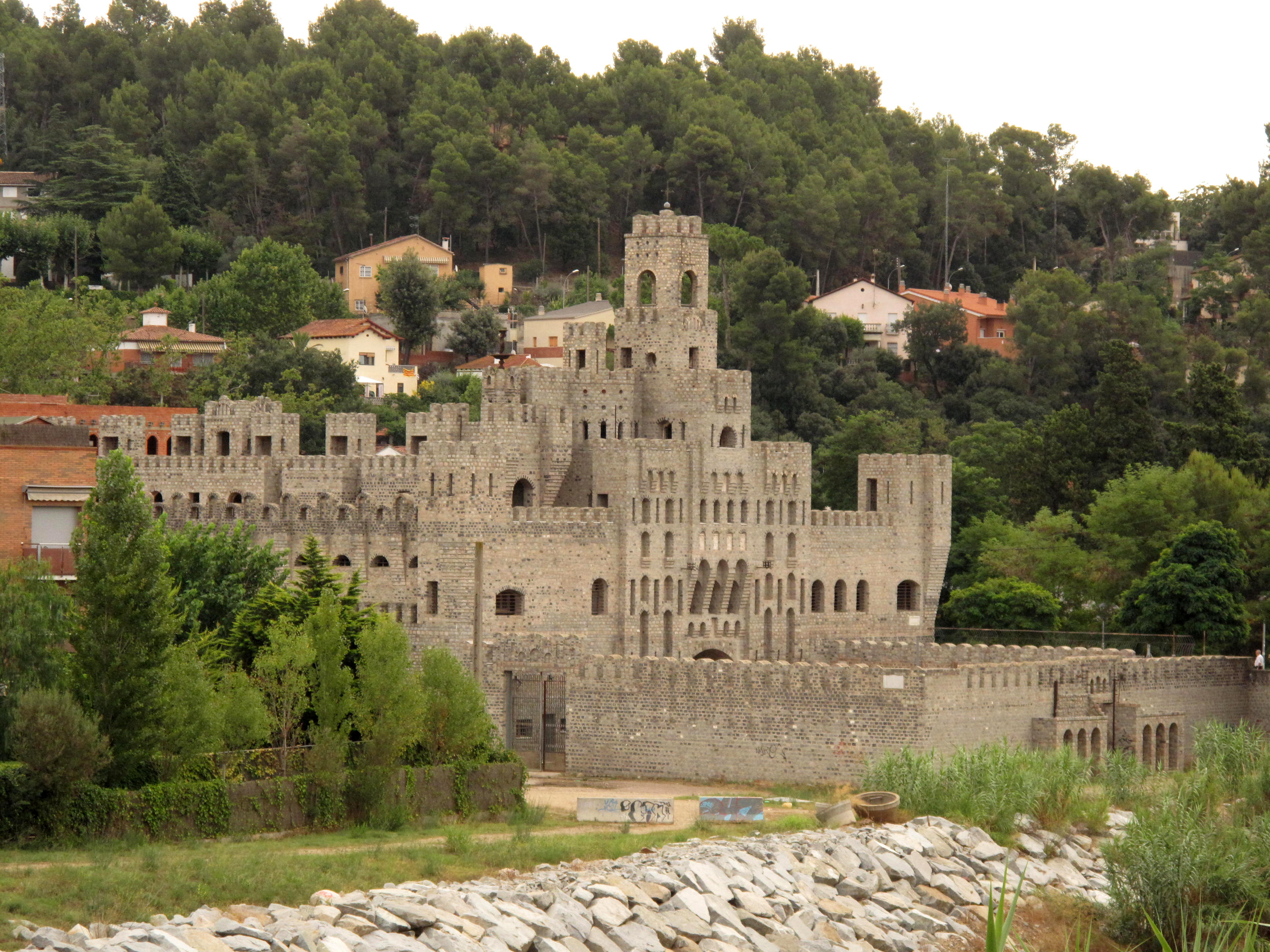
The castle of Les Fonts

Les Fonts is a neighbourhood in Terrassa in the comarca of Vallès Occidental, located in Barcelona, Catalonia, Spain.

== Population ==
As of 2009, the population is 2,336. The postal code is 08228.

== Transportation ==
The town is served by the Les Fonts station of the FGC line S1.

== Name ==
The name Les Fonts is Catalan for The Fountains.
