= Barcelona–Vallès Line =

Railway line in Barcelona, Spain

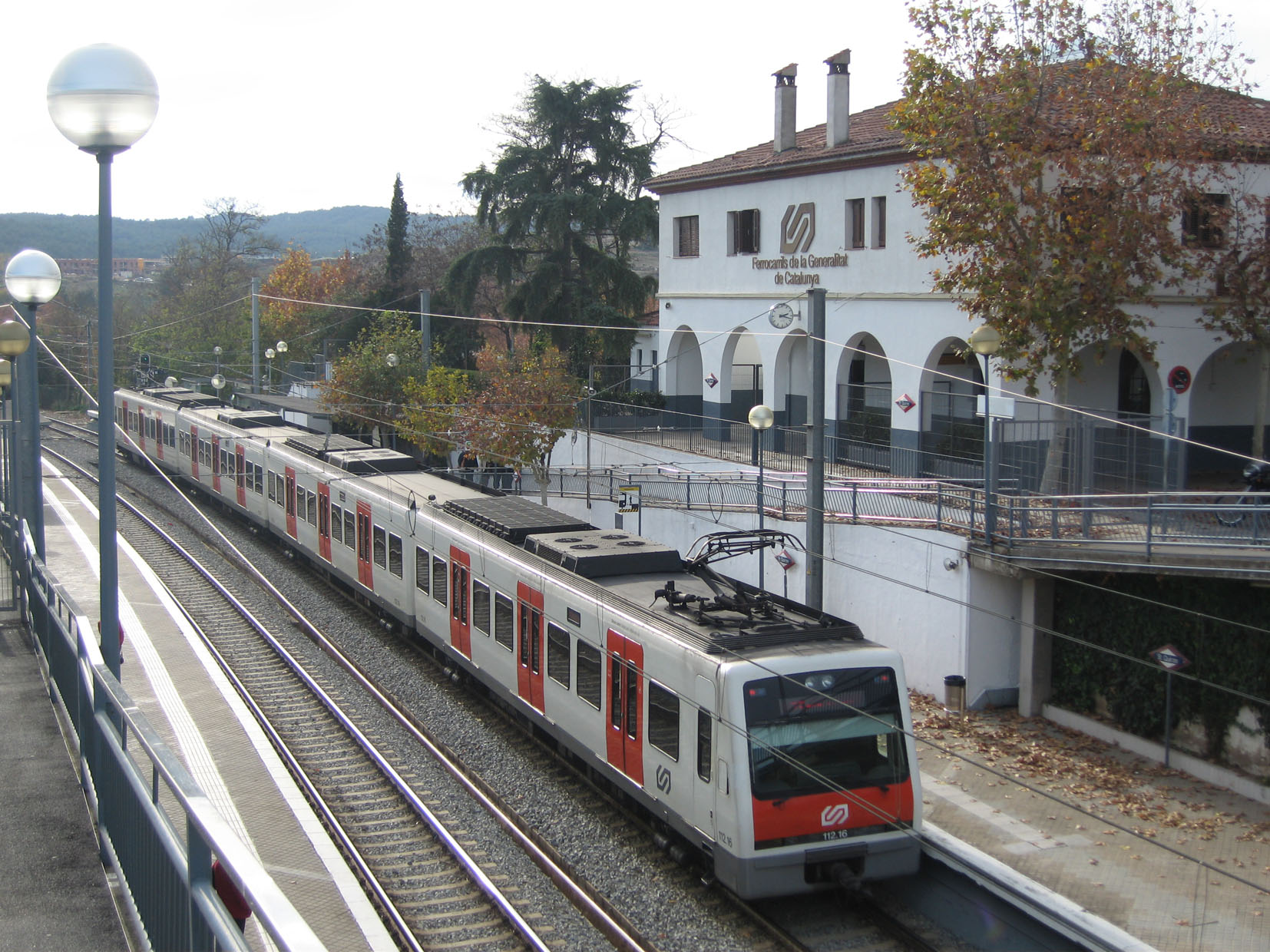
- A 112 Series train at Sant Quirze station.

Overview
- Native name: Línia Barcelona-Vallès
- Status: Operational
- Owner: Government of Catalonia
- Line number: L6, L7, L12, S1, S2
- Locale: Barcelona metropolitan area
- Termini: Pl. Catalunya; Av. Tibidabo, Reina Elisenda, Terrassa Nacions Unides, Sabadell Parc del Nord
- Stations: 40

Service
- Type: Rapid transit, commuter rail
- Operator: Ferrocarrils de la Generalitat de Catalunya (FGC)
- Depots: Rubí Operations Center; Can Roca Depot; Ca n'Oriac Depot
- Rolling stock: 22 112 Series EMU sets; 19 113 Series EMU sets; 5 114 Series EMU sets
- Ridership: 64,101,981 passenger journeys (2018)

History
- Opened: 24 June 1863

Technical
- Line length: 48.1 km (29.9 mi)
- Number of tracks: 2
- Character: At-grade, underground (in central Barcelona, Sabadell and Terrassa)
- Track gauge: 1,435 mm (4 ft 8 1/2 in) standard gauge
- Old gauge: 1,672 mm (5 ft 5 13/16 in)
- Electrification: 1,500 V DC overhead lines

The Barcelona–Vallès Line (Catalan: Línia Barcelona-Vallès) is an unconnected standard gauge rapid transit and commuter railway line linking Barcelona with Sabadell and Terrassa via the Collserola mountain range, in Catalonia, Spain. Its name refers to the Catalan historical region of Vallès, whereby most part of the line runs. Plaça de Catalunya station serves as the Barcelona terminus of the line, where almost all its trains either start or terminate. The line then continues northwards and branches off twice before leaving the city limits. Its main route splits in two in Sant Cugat del Vallès, forming two major branches to Sabadell and Terrassa. It has 40 passenger stations in operation and a total line length of 48.1 kilometres (29.9 mi).

The origins of the line date from 1863, when a privately owned railway from Barcelona to the then-separated town of Sarrià was opened. In 1912, Catalan engineer Carles Emili Montañès created the company Ferrocarriles de Cataluña (FCC) in order to take control of the line and extend it northwards. After successive extensions, the line reached Terrassa and Sabadell in 1919 and 1922, respectively. In 1977, FCC announced that the whole line was to be closed due to the company's bad economic results. Nevertheless, the Spanish government prevented that from happening by taking control of it. The line was transferred to the Catalan government in 1979, and has been operated by Ferrocarrils de la Generalitat de Catalunya (FGC) ever since. Currently, the most prominent intervention on the line is the extension of the Terrassa and Sabadell branches through the construction of a route underneath the two cities; the former was completed in 2015, whilst the latter did so in 2017.

Barcelona Metro rapid transit lines 6, 7 and 12 serve the line's urban branches within Barcelona, while the rest of the line is operated as a high-frequency commuter rail system known as Vallès Metro (Catalan: Metro del Vallès). This system further includes the Vallvidrera Funicular, which is also operated by FGC. The Barcelona–Vallès Line is part of the Autoritat del Transport Metropolità (ATM) fare-integrated public transport system for the Barcelona metropolitan area.

== History ==
The Barcelona–Vallès Line was opened in 1863 with the old Iberian gauge of 1,672 mm, and was electrified and regauged to standard gauge (1,435 mm) in 1905.

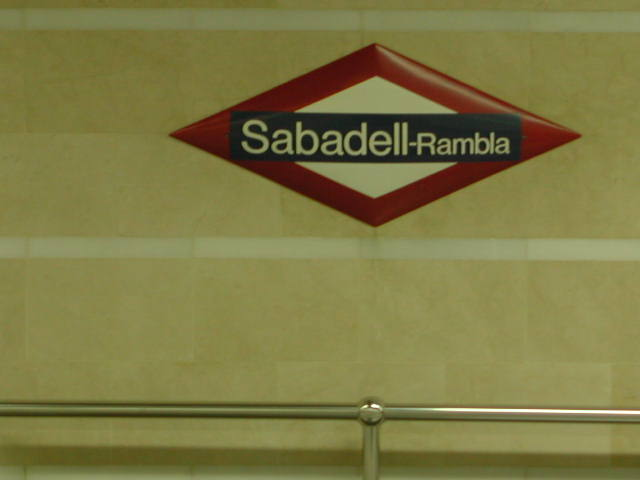
Current FGC plate at the Sabadell-Rambla station. This station was replaced with the construction of further stations in the town.

Sabadell Metro (Catalan and Spanish: Metro de Sabadell), is the name of the underground subway line in Sabadell. It is operated by the Catalan government-owned rail company Ferrocarrils de la Generalitat de Catalunya. Construction of the subway line started in late 2006 and was due to be finished by 2011 or 2012, depending on which project the FGC finally decided on. However, work was temporarily halted due to the 2008–2014 Spanish financial crisis, but later resumed and the first phase opened in two stages in September 2016 and July 2017.

The proposed line will join the city centre of Sabadell with its northern neighbourhoods, where it will join the Renfe network line, and will effectively link the city with Barcelona through the main FGC lines. The terminus of the current general FGC line, a station called Sabadell – Rambla, will disappear as it will be replaced by this network. The original project, if fulfilled, will be 4.2 km long. It has been criticised for devising a subway line that would run nearly parallel to the Renfe line, which has been deemed ineffective enough to suit the needs of a city the size of Sabadell. Also, a civic association called Sabadell Cruïlla has proposed the construction of a larger metro system to link Sabadell with other large cities in the immediate region such as Terrassa and Granollers. In addition to that, it has proposed several changes to the initial project so the subway line would reach Torreromeu and Polinyà.

Terrassa Metro is the name of the current subway in Terrassa, Catalonia, Spain, operated by the Catalan government-owned rail company Ferrocarrils de la Generalitat de Catalunya (FGC). It could be more accurately defined as an underground addition to the already existing FGC commuter train network in the city, located in the metropolitan area of Barcelona. Construction of the subway line was due to start in 2008 and the date of completion was estimated to be in 2010. The proposed line will link the already existing FGC station Terrassa – Rambla with the Renfe rail line in the city, and will cover a larger portion of the city area, including the Polytechnic University of Catalonia schools located in Terrassa. Construction of the tunnel in Can Roca started in April 2007. Generalitat de Catalunya stated a budget of 178.8 million euros will be available for the construction of the Terrassa Metro, which will be made up of an addition to the Terrassa train stations belonging to the FGC line S1. FGC and Renfe budgets combined sum will sum 321 million euros. Renfe itself is going to build another station in the city: Terrassa Est – Passeig del Camp Parts of the Vallès line operated by FGC are actually known under the collective name of Metro del Vallès since 1996, which will include the Terrassa service and the extension of S2 which will become Sabadell Metro in the almost adjacent municipality of Sabadell, which is already under construction.

== Route description ==
The Barcelona–Vallès Line has its start point at Plaça de Catalunya station, which is located directly underneath El Triangle shopping mall, on the southwesternmost side of Plaça de Catalunya ("Catalonia Square"), a major public transport hub in the Barcelona district of Eixample. The line then continues northwestwards in an underground route along Balmes Street until its intersection with Diagonal Avenue, from this point on running underneath Via Augusta. After Gràcia station, the line branches off thanks to a flying junction, forming a 1.9-kilometre-long (1.2 mi) stretch to Avinguda Tibidabo station. Contrarily to the line's main route, this branch line keeps on running northwestwards, following again Balmes Street up to its northern end, which is also the northern terminus of the branch line.

The main line towards Vallès bends westwards exactly following Via Augusta on its way along the Sarrià-Sant Gervasi district. It branches off again at Sarrià station, forming a 0.6-kilometre-long (0.37 mi) stretch to Reina Elisenda station. The main route, however, continues northwards in a backwards C-shaped route through Barcelona's last streets at the foot of the Collserola mountain range. At this point, the line runs on a succession of alternated open-cut and underground sections before eventually crossing the Vallvidrera neighborhood through a 1.6-kilometre-long (0.99 mi) tunnel in a northwest direction. It then continues going across Collserola's central area above ground, running parallel to C-16 motorway up to Valldoreix station in Sant Cugat del Vallès, passing through Les Planes and La Floresta neighborhoods. Next, the line curves northeasterly, getting closer to Sant Cugat del Vallès city center. It diverges into two main branch lines immediately after Sant Cugat station: the Terrassa branch curves markedly in a west direction, while the Sabadell branch runs northwards.

On the one hand, the stretch to Terrassa continues moving away from Sant Cugat del Vallès in a northwesterly direction towards Rubí, where the line's main depot and operations centre is located. It goes along the western limits of Rubí city centre, describing a straight route northwards to the Les Fonts neighbourhood. The branch line proceeds by slightly curving northwesterly, and penetrates into Terrassa city center through a route underneath Rambla del Pare Alegre and Rambla d'Égara streets. After Terrassa Rambla station, it runs in a S-shaped route, reaching Vallparadís Park, then continuing northwards, terminating at Terrassa Nacions Unides station.

On the other hand, the stretch to Sabadell curves northeasterly as it approaches the end of its route through Sant Cugat del Vallès. It then passes through Cerdanyola del Vallès's Bellaterra neighborhood before curving notably in a southwest direction and, shortly after, again in a northeast direction, reaching the Bellaterra campus of the Autonomous University of Barcelona. Before curving northwesterly, the branch line crosses a part of the campus thanks to a short tunnel and, about 700 metres (2,300 ft) further, it goes through another short tunnel as it bends west. It curves in a north direction towards Sant Quirze del Vallès immediately after. The line then enters Sabadell in a northeast direction, continuing above ground up to Can Feu | Gràcia station; hereafter, running in an underground route terminating at Sabadell Parc del Nord station.

== Infrastructure ==
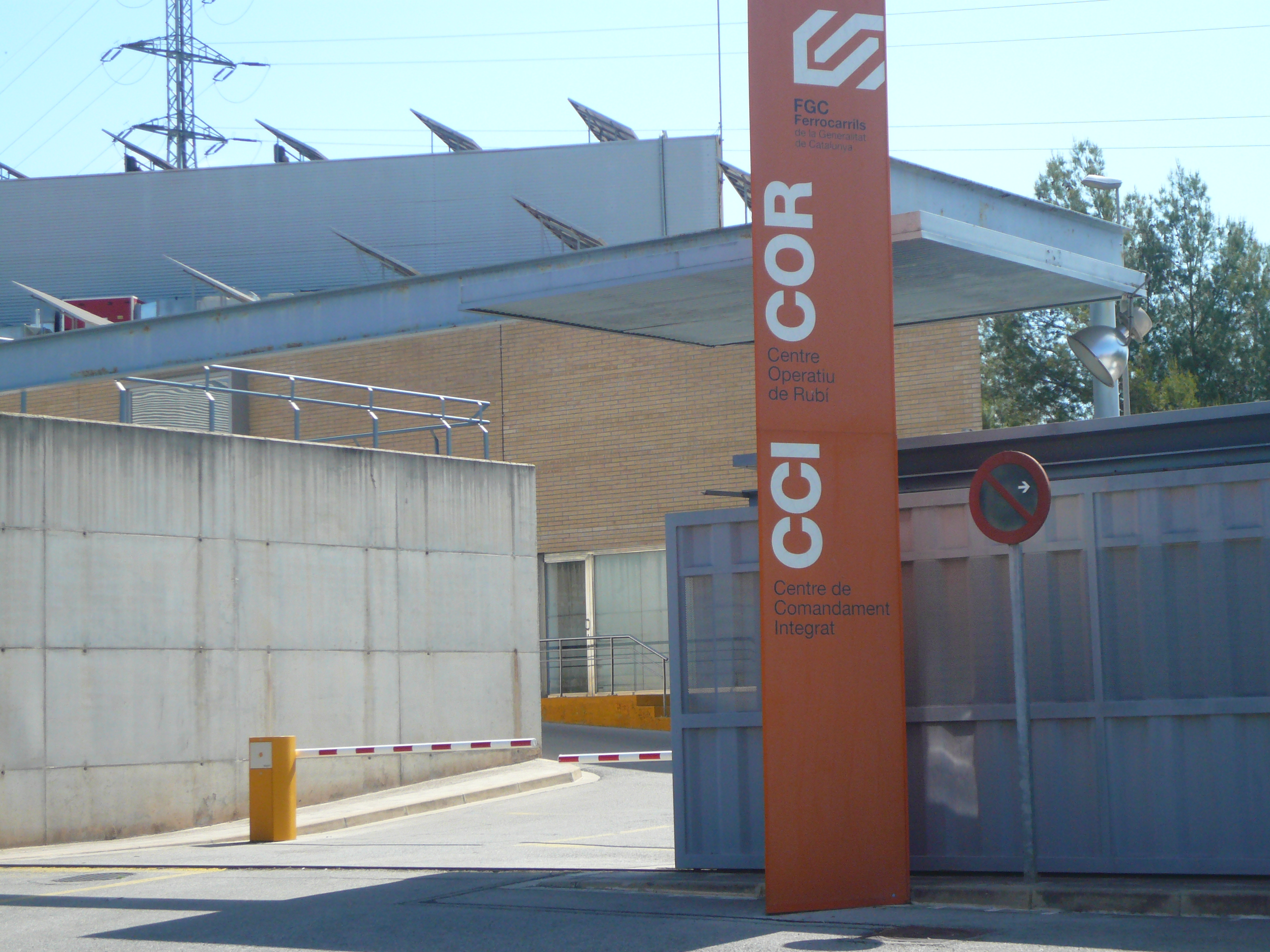
Entrance to Rubí Operations Center.

The line accounts for a total length of 48.1 kilometres (29.9 mi) and is entirely electrified at 1,500 volts direct current (DC) using overhead lines. It is grade-separated in its whole length, running completely underground in central Barcelona, Terrassa and Sabadell. Excepting for the single-track section between Sabadell Estació and Sabadell Rambla stations, the rest of the line has double track. Besides, an additional 4.4-kilometre-long (2.7 mi) line section belonging to the extension of the Sabadell branch is currently under construction. Once completed, it will allow for the dismantling of the line's only remaining single-track section. The signaling and security systems used on the line are centralized traffic control (CTC) and automatic train protection (ATP). The line features standard gauge (1,435 mm (4 ft 8 1/2 in)), unlike Spain's conventional mainline railway system, which features the broader Iberian gauge (1,668 mm (5 ft 5 21/32 in)), and to which it is unconnected.

A total of 34 railway stations are situated along the line, all of which are disabled-accessible. 19 out of 34 stations are underground, while the rest are at-grade, and 6 out of 34 are transfer stations. The opening of the extension of the Sabadell branch will suppose the incorporation of 5 new underground stations, one of which will be a transfer station to the Rodalies de Catalunya commuter and regional rail system.

The line's operation is centralised at Rubí Operations Centre, a rail complex run by Ferrocarrils de la Generalitat de Catalunya (FGC) located south of Rubí station. It contains a repair shop and a depot for the rolling stock as well as the Integrated Control Center (ICC), which includes the CTC center and further serves the Llobregat–Anoia Line. The ICC is also in charge of supervising and regulating the facilities found in the line's stations such as elevators, escalators and ticket vending machines, among other functions. Together with the rest of the Terrassa branch extension project, a small 220-metre-long (720 ft) depot located at the end of the branch line was opened in July 2015. It is known as Can Roca Depot and has a maximum capacity of 8 four-car trains. Before being dismantled in November 2004, there had existed a depot and a repair shop near Barcelona's Sarrià station. In July 2017, an additional major depot was opened north of Sabadell Parc del Nord station as part of the Sabadell branch extension project.

== Operation ==
=== Rail services ===
Several rapid transit and commuter rail services run on the Barcelona–Vallès Line, all of them either starting or terminating at Plaça de Catalunya station in central Barcelona (excepting the L12 shuttle services).

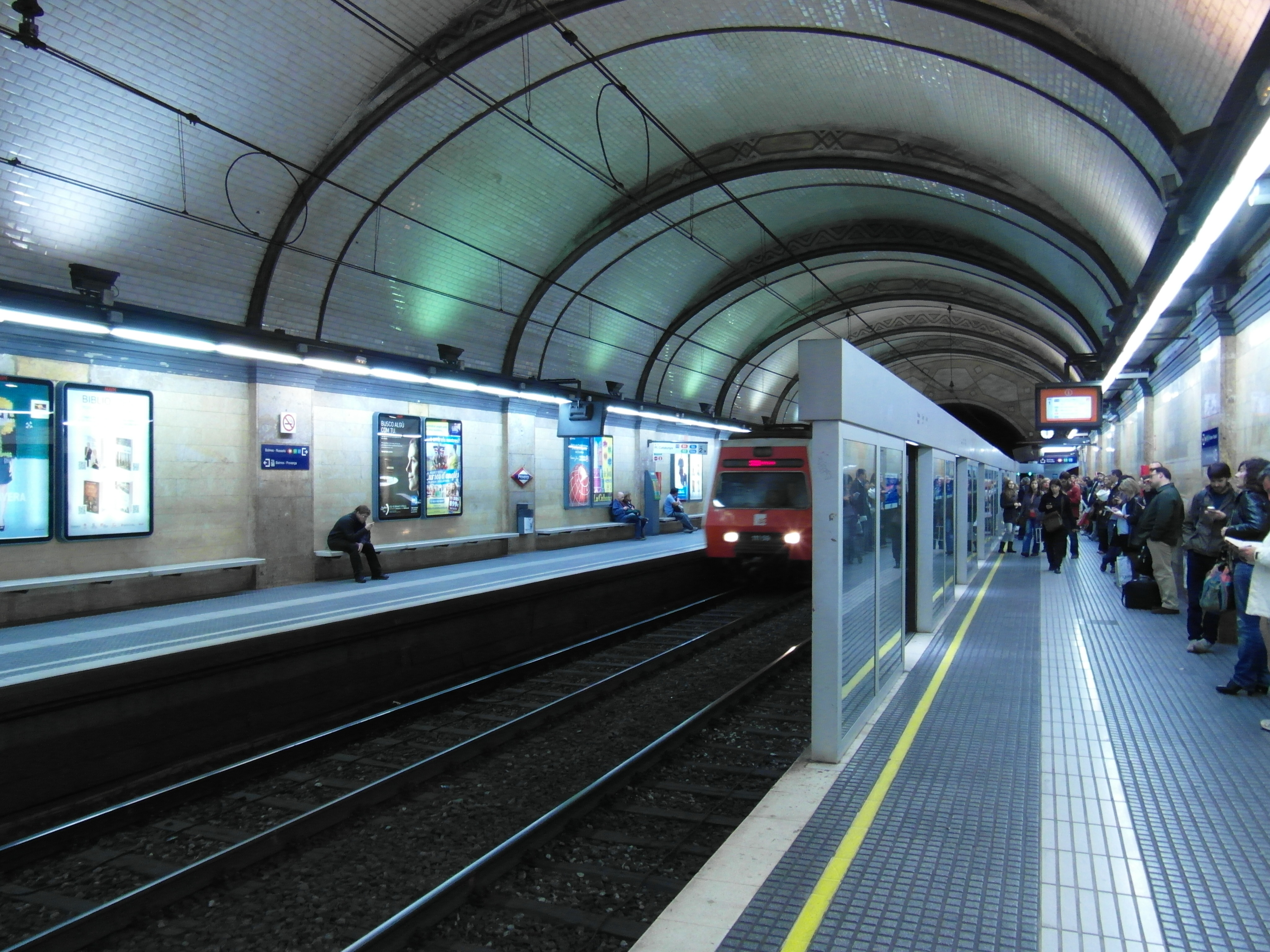
All rail services call at Barcelona's Provença, the second-busiest station on the line after Pl. Catalunya.

==== Service hours ====
The first trains run about 4:30 in the morning to midnight, with later starting times on weekends. Currently, there are no overnight services, though the last trains run just after 2:00 the following morning on Friday and Saturday nights as well as on public holidays. Continuous overnight rapid transit services had previously been offered on Saturdays, though they were suspended to reduce operational costs in January 2012.

==== Barcelona Metro (L lines) ====
Rapid transit services run only on the two urban branch lines within the city of Barcelona and are considered part of the Barcelona Metro system, so that they are numbered and colored consistent with the rest of the system's lines—all Barcelona Metro lines are designated with the letter "L" plus a number, and each is colored distinctly on maps. The services running between Plaça Catalunya and Sarrià are designated L6 and colored deep lavender, the shuttle trains between Sarrià and Reina Elisenda are designated L12 and colored pale lavender, whilst the services running on the Avinguda Tibidabo branch are designated L7 and colored brown. The L7 is also often referred to as Balmes Line (Catalan: Línia de Balmes). Before November 6, 2003, L6 and L7 services were designated U6 and U7, respectively, with the letter "U" standing for "urban", and were not considered part of the Barcelona Metro.

==== Vallès Metro (S lines) ====
Commuter rail services run between Barcelona and other locations in the Vallès area, and are known under the collective name of Vallès Metro (Catalan: Metro del Vallès). They are designated with the letter "S", which stands for "suburban", plus a number. End-to-end services to Terrassa and Sabadell are designated S1 and S2, respectively, and run continuously all-year-around. During rush hour, additional partial services run between Barcelona and other stations in the Vallès area in each direction, operating as skip-stop clones of S1 and S2 services.

==== Frequencies ====
The current line scheme allows for peak-time service frequencies of less than 6 minutes in each direction on the Av. Tibidabo, Terrassa and Sabadell branches, and 4 minutes on the Reina Elisenda branch. The overall service frequency increases as the line gets closer to central Barcelona, where the core route between Pl. Catalunya and Gràcia stations provides a headway of less than 2 minutes in each direction during rush hours. Thus, with up to 32 trains per hour in each direction, the Pl. Catalunya–Gràcia section of the Barcelona–Vallès Line is one of Europe's busiest commuter rail lines by number of operations together with RER line A in Paris or portions of the Berlin S-Bahn.

==== List of Rail services on the Barcelona–Vallès Line ====
Rail services on the Barcelona–Vallès Line
Line	From	To	No. of stations	Frequency			Travel time	Notes
Line	From	To	No. of stations	RH	OP	WE	Travel time	Notes
	Barcelona Pl. Catalunya	Sarrià	8	—	10'	15′	12′	Line L6 does not run at rush hour to allow a more intensive service on lines S1 and S2.
	Barcelona Pl. Catalunya	Av. Tibidabo	7	7′ 30"	7' 30"	15′	10′	
	Sarrià	Reina Elisenda	2	6′	10′	10′	2′	
	Barcelona Pl. Catalunya	Terrassa Nacions Unides	22	5'	10′	20′	53′	S1 and S2 trains call at all stations along their routes since December 9, 2022.
	Barcelona Pl. Catalunya	Sabadell Parc del Nord	24	5'	10′	20′	54′	S1 and S2 trains call at all stations along their routes since December 9, 2022.

=== Rolling stock ===
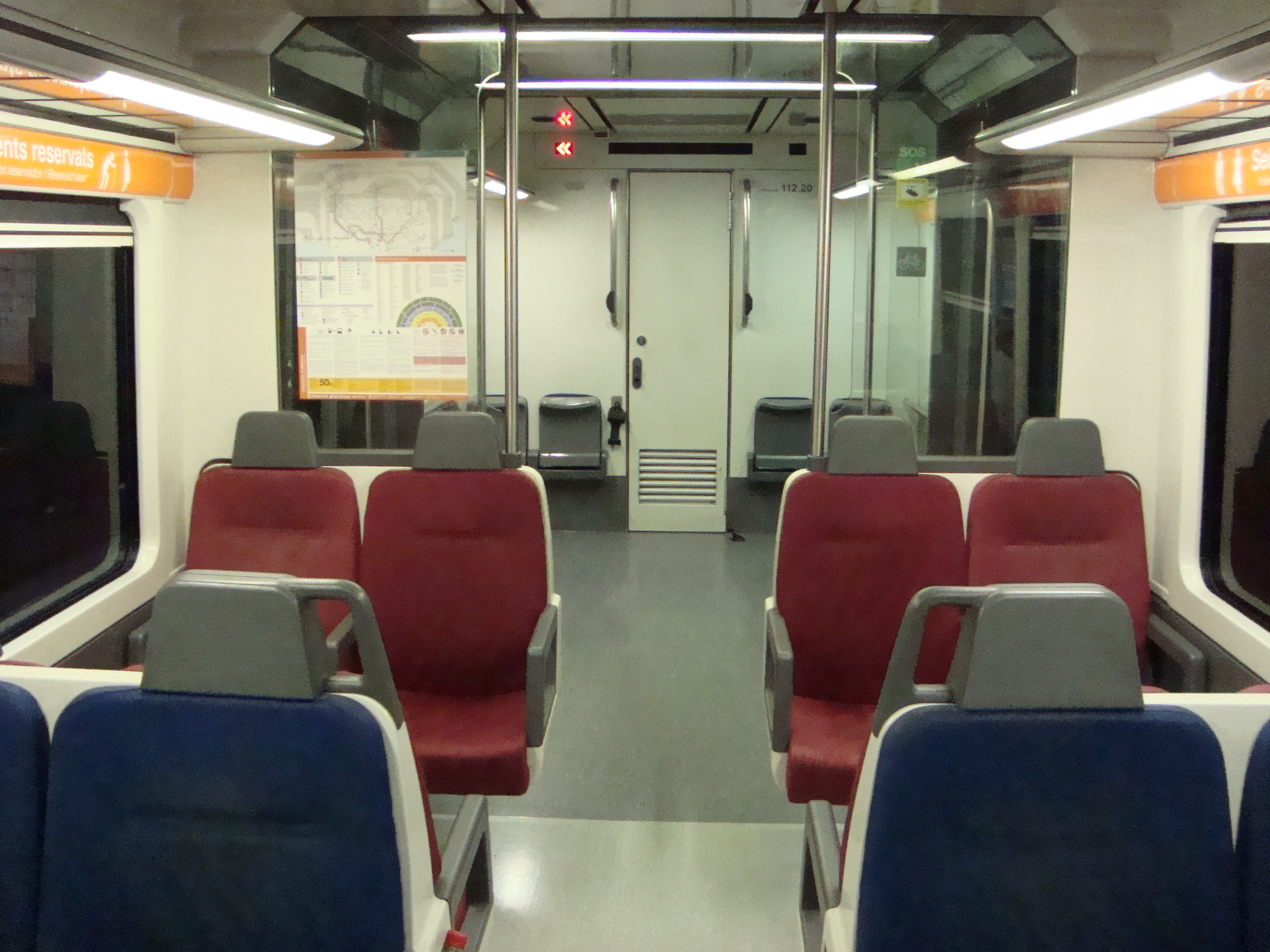
Interior of a 112 Series train.

The trains on the Barcelona–Vallès Line are currently the 112, 113, 114 and 115 Series. There are a total of 66 electrical multiple units, all of which are disabled-accessible, air-conditioned and equipped with the automatic train protection (ATP) security system. The trains are technically very similar, though the 112 Series are notably different than the 113 and 114 Series in their design. They all feature the colors of the Ferrocarrils de la Generalitat de Catalunya (FGC) logo—white and orange.

An initial 16-unit set of 112 Series trains started operating on the line between 1995 and 1996, and another 6-unit set did so in 2003. Considering both their technical features and design, the 112 Series are almost identical to the 213 Series that run on the Llobregat–Anoia Line. The latter, however, feature 1,000 mm (3 ft 3 3/8 in) metre gauge and consist of three cars, while the 112 Series feature 1,435 mm (4 ft 8 1/2 in) standard gauge and consist of four cars. The entry into service of the first set of 112 Series trains allowed for the implementation of the current Vallès Metro high-frequency line scheme as well as the removal of the former three-car 400 Series in 1996. Together with the Brill 10–27, Brill 301–312 and 600 Series units, the 400 Series were originally operated by Ferrocarriles de Cataluña (FCC) and one unit of each series is preserved as part of FGC's historical rolling stock. The 112 Series is used on services on the Terrassa, Sabadell and Reina Elisenda branches.

Before the entry into service of the 113 and 114 Series throughout 2014, a former 20-unit set of the three-car 111 Series trains had run on the line. These trains started operating between 1983 and 1987, and were the line's first modern electrical multiple units. From January 2014 on, a 19-unit set of the four-car 113 Series trains progressively started operating on the Sabadell, Terrassa and Reina Elisenda branches together with the 112 Series. In December of the same year, a 5-unit set of the three-car 114 Series trains started operating on the Avinguda Tibidabo branch, whose station platforms are too short to hold four-car trains such as the 112 and 113 Series. The 113 and 114 Series are identical in both their technical features and design, though they differ in the number of cars and present some modifications on the seat layout. After the arrival of the 113 and 114 Series, 111 Series trains were removed from circulation and dismantled. Yet, one unit has been preserved as part of FGC's historical rolling stock.

In December 2017, FGC ordered 15 new four-car EMUs, designated the 115 Series, from Stadler Rail's ex-MACOSA facility with entry into service planned for 2019.

Operating rolling stock on the Barcelona–Vallès Line (as of March 2018)
Series	Image	Type	Top speed		Number	Cars per set	Seats	Total capacity	Entry into service	References
Series	Image	Type	km/h	mph	Number	Cars per set	Seats	Total capacity	Entry into service	References
112 Series		Electrical multiple unit	90	56	22	4	232	722	1995–1996, 2003	
113 Series		Electrical multiple unit	90	56	19	4	188	780	2014	
114 Series		Electrical multiple unit	90	56	5	3	124	605	2014	
115 Series		Electrical multiple unit	—	—	15	4	—	—	2019	

== List of stations ==
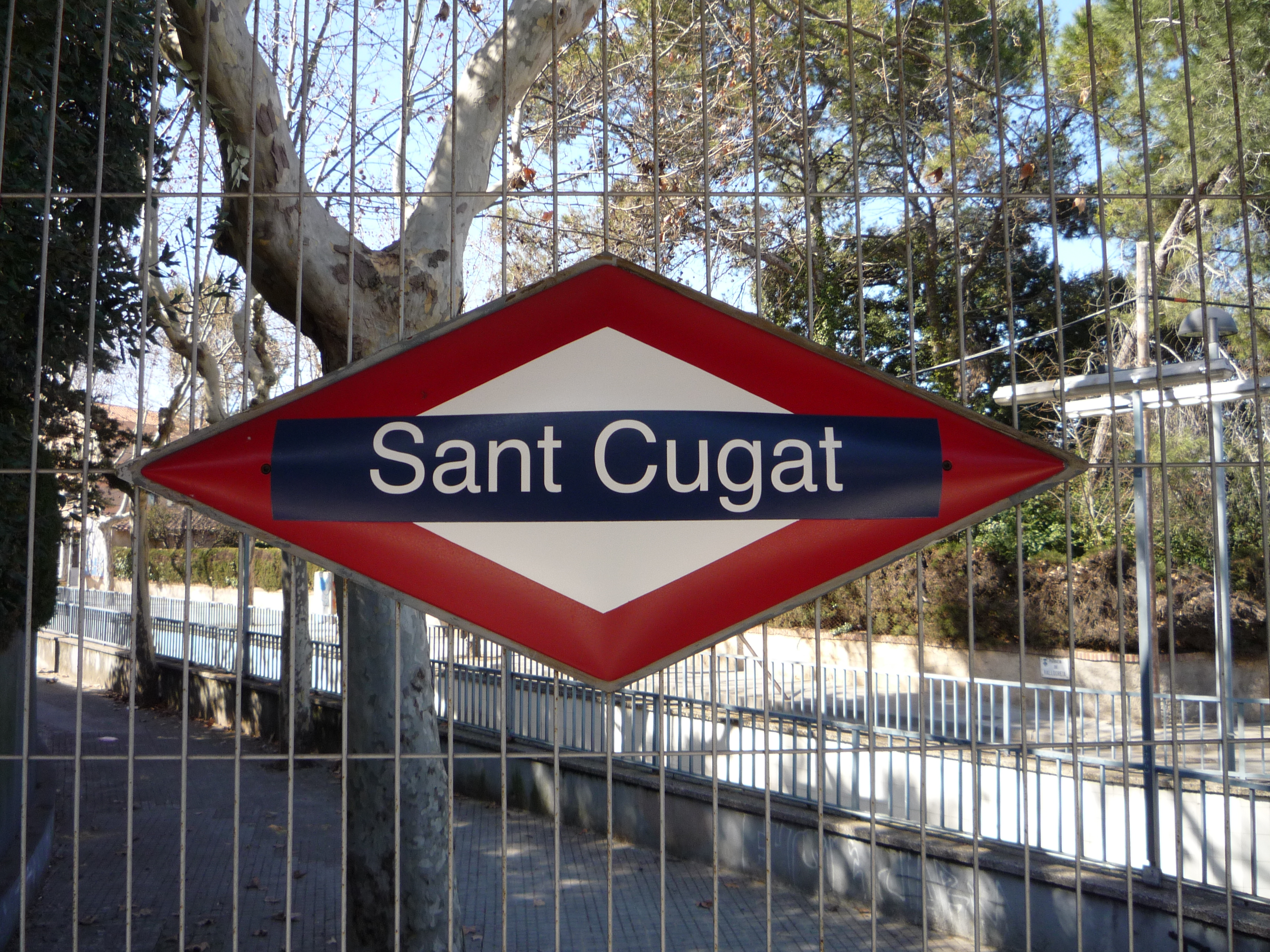
All the stations on the Barcelona–Vallès Line feature a characteristic rhombus-shaped nameplate. This one belongs to Sant Cugat station.

The following table lists the name of each station on the Barcelona–Vallès Line in order from south to north; a photo of the current station; the rail services operating at the station—L6, L7, L12, S1, S2—; if applicable, the date the current station was opened; the municipality or the city district (in the case of Barcelona) in which each station is or will be located; the fare zone each station belongs or will belong to according to the Autoritat del Transport Metropolità (ATM) fare-integrated public transport system; remarkable notes about the station, including clarifications, additional information and a location map; and usage figures.

#	Terminal of a service
*	Transfer station
#*	Transfer station and terminal
‡	Non-accessible station
‡#	Non-accessible, terminal station
‡*	Non-accessible, transfer station
§	Station under construction
†	Closed station
¤	Station located in Barcelona; city district indicated instead of municipality
●	The train stops at the station
｜	The train skips the station

Station	Photo	Line(s)					Opened	Municipality	Fare zone	Notes	Usage (Note: All usage figures (entry only) are in millions per year for 2013.)
Main route
Pl. Catalunya#*		●	●	No service	●	●	24 Apr 1929	Eixample¤	1	Original at-grade station opened on 23 June 1863. Connects with Rodalies de Catalunya commuter and regional rail services, as well as with Barcelona Metro lines 1 and 3.^{map 1}	11.35
Provença*		●	●	No service	●	●	24 Apr 1929	Eixample¤	1	Original at-grade station opened 18 August 1882. Connects with Barcelona Metro lines 3 and 5 at Diagonal station.^{map 2}	8.2
Gràcia		●	●	No service	●	●	24 Apr 1929	Gràcia–Sarrià-Sant Gervasi¤	1	Original at-grade station opened 23 June 1863.^{map 3}	2.76
Av. Tibidabo branch
Pl. Molina*		No service	●	No service	No service	No service	1 Jan 1954	Sarrià-Sant Gervasi¤	1	In 2009, it was linked to Sant Gervasi station, on the line's main route, offering a transfer to L6.^{map 4}	0.21
Pàdua		No service	●	No service	No service	No service	1 Jan 1954	Sarrià-Sant Gervasi¤	1	^{map 5}	0.64
El Putxet		No service	●	No service	No service	No service	1 Jan 1954	Sarrià-Sant Gervasi¤	1	^{map 6}	1.42
Av. Tibidabo#*		No service	●	No service	No service	No service	1 Jan 1954	Sarrià-Sant Gervasi¤	1	Connects with the heritage streetcar Tramvia Blau.^{map 7}	1.56
Main route
Sant Gervasi*		●	No service	No service	●	●	24 Apr 1929	Sarrià-Sant Gervasi¤	1	Original at-grade station opened 23 June 1863. In 2009, it was linked to Plaça Molina station, on the Av. Tibidabo branch, offering a transfer to the L7.^{map 8}	1.01
Muntaner		●	No service	No service	●	●	20 Jun 1953	Sarrià-Sant Gervasi¤	1	Original at-grade station opened 30 June 1908.^{map 9}	2.76
La Bonanova		●	No service	No service	●	●	12 May 1952	Sarrià-Sant Gervasi¤	1	Original at-grade station opened 1887.^{map 10}	0.93
Les Tres Torres		●	No service	No service	●	●	12 May 1952	Sarrià-Sant Gervasi¤	1	Original at-grade station opened 17 December 1906.^{map 11}	1.05
Sarrià#*		●	No service	●	●	●	2 Oct 1976	Sarrià-Sant Gervasi¤	1	Original at-grade station opened 23 June 1863.^{map 12}	3.45
Reina Elisenda branch
Reina Elisenda#		No service	No service	●	No service	No service	2 Oct 1976	Sarrià-Sant Gervasi¤	1	^{map 13}	0.87
Main route
Peu del Funicular*					●	●	28 Nov 1916	Sarrià-Sant Gervasi¤	1	Connects with the Vallvidrera Funicular.^{map 14}	0.35
Baixador de Vallvidrera					●	●	28 Nov 1916	Sarrià-Sant Gervasi¤	1	^{map 15}	0.38
Les Planes					●	●	28 Nov 1916	Sarrià-Sant Gervasi¤	1	^{map 16}	0.37
La Floresta					●	●	9 Aug 1925	Sant Cugat del Vallès	2C	^{map 17}	0.39
Valldoreix					●	●	3 May 1931	Sant Cugat del Vallès	2C	^{map 18}	1.06
Sant Cugat					●	●	26 Oct 1917	Sant Cugat del Vallès	2C	^{map 20}	3.43
Terrassa branch
Mira-sol		No service	No service	No service	●	No service	1948	Sant Cugat del Vallès	2C	^{map 20}	0.52
Hospital General		No service	No service	No service	●	No service	1985	Sant Cugat del Vallès	2C	^{map 21}	0.44
Rubí		No service	No service	No service	●	No service	13 Sep 1918	Rubí	2C	^{map 22}	2.08
Les Fonts		No service	No service	No service	●	No service	28 Dec 1919	Terrassa	3C	^{map 23}	0.38
Terrassa Rambla		No service	No service	No service	●	No service	16 May 1986	Terrassa	3C	Original at-grade station opened 28 December 1919.^{map 24}	2.17
Vallparadís Universitat		No service	No service	No service	●	No service	28 Jul 2015	Terrassa	3C	^{map 25}	—
Terrassa Estació del Nord*		No service	No service	No service	●	No service	28 Jul 2015	Terrassa	3C	Connects with Rodalies de Catalunya commuter and regional rail services.^{map 26}	—
Terrassa Nacions Unides#		No service	No service	No service	●	No service	28 Jul 2015	Terrassa	3C	^{map 27}	—
Sabadell branch
Volpelleres*		No service	No service	No service	No service	●	5 Jun 2010	Sant Cugat del Vallès	2C	Connects with Rodalies de Catalunya's Barcelona commuter rail service line R8 at Sant Cugat del Vallès railway station (about 700 m or 2,300 ft).^{map 28}	0.58
Sant Joan		No service	No service	No service	No service	●	Sep 1965	Sant Cugat del Vallès	2C	^{map 29}	0.94
Bellaterra		No service	No service	No service	No service	●	22 Jun 1930	Cerdanyola del Vallès	2C	^{map 30}	0.47
Autonomous University		No service	No service	No service	No service	●	8 Oct 1984	Cerdanyola del Vallès	2C	^{map 31}	1.65
Sant Quirze		No service	No service	No service	No service	●	1 Jun 1922	Sant Quirze del Vallès	2C	^{map 32}	0.71
Can Feu | Gràcia		No service	No service	No service	No service	●	13 Sep 2016	Sabadell	2C	Original at-grade station opened 1 June 1922. Known as Sabadell Estació prior to September 2016. ^{map 33}	0.71
Sabadell Rambla†		No service	No service	No service	No service	｜	21 Sep 1925	Sabadell	—	Station closed 13 September 2016 after the first phase of the Sabadell branch extension project opened for passenger service.^{map 34}	1.33
Sabadell Plaça Major		No service	No service	No service	No service	●	13 Sep 2016	Sabadell	2C	^{map 35}	—
La Creu Alta	—	No service	No service	No service	No service	●	20 Jul 2017	Sabadell	2C	^{map 36}	—
Sabadell Nord*	—	No service	No service	No service	No service	●	20 Jul 2017	Sabadell	2C	This station offers connections with Rodalies de Catalunya commuter and regional rail services.^{map 37}	—
Sabadell Parc del Nord#	—	No service	No service	No service	No service	●	20 Jul 2017	Sabadell	2C	^{map 38}	—

== Future ==
Map of potential extensions for L3 and L12

A three-station extension of L12 from Reina Elisenda to a new transfer station at Finestrelles - Sant Joan de Déu in the Esplugues de Llobregat municipality, where an extension of Barcelona Metro L3 is also under construction, is expected to be opened in 2030.

== See also ==
- Ferrocarrils de la Generalitat de Catalunya
- Barcelona Metro
- Vallvidrera Funicular
- Llobregat–Anoia Line

== Maps ==
- ^map 1Pl. Catalunya – 41.386025°N 2.168669°E
- ^map 2Provença – 41.392856°N 2.157928°E
- ^map 3Gràcia – 41.399086°N 2.152635°E
- ^map 4Pl. Molina – 41.401692°N 2.146748°E
- ^map 5Pàdua – 41.403502°N 2.142757°E
- ^map 6El Putxet – 41.405823°N 2.139152°E
- ^map 7Av. Tibidabo – 41.409643°N 2.137163°E
- ^map 8Sant Gervasi – 41.401067°N 2.147130°E
- ^map 9Muntaner – 41.398531°N 2.142334°E
- ^map 10La Bonanova – 41.397814°N 2.136428°E
- ^map 11Les Tres Torres – 41.397801°N 2.130811°E
- ^map 12Sarrià – 41.398497°N 2.125570°E
- ^map 13Reina Elisenda – 41.398746°N 2.118929°E
- ^map 14Peu del Funicular – 41.409215°N 2.111178°E
- ^map 15Baixador de Vallvidrera – 41.420093°N 2.096931°E
- ^map 16Les Planes – 41.427401°N 2.091616°E
- ^map 17La Floresta – 41.444873°N 2.073165°E
- ^map 18Valldoreix – 41.457842°N 2.068300°E
- ^map 19Sant Cugat – 41.467912°N 2.078219°E
- ^map 20Mira-sol – 41.469367°N 2.061380°E
- ^map 21Hospital General – 41.476250°N 2.046510°E
- ^map 22Rubí – 41.486297°N 2.031350°E
- ^map 23Les Fonts – 41.528478°N 2.033598°E
- ^map 24Terrassa Rambla – 41.559742°N 2.007527°E
- ^map 25Vallparadís Universitat – 41.563315°N 2.018918°E
- ^map 26Terrassa Estació del Nord – 41.570400°N 2.015713°E
- ^map 27Terrassa Nacions Unides – 41.581092°N 2.013278°E
- ^map 28Volpelleres – 41.481232°N 2.072882°E
- ^map 29Sant Joan – 41.490185°N 2.076455°E
- ^map 30Bellaterra – 41.500844°N 2.090587°E
- ^map 31Autonomous University – 41.502834°N 2.102541°E
- ^map 32Sant Quirze – 41.529977°N 2.088769°E
- ^map 33Can Feu | Gràcia – 41.542549°N 2.100441°E
- ^map 34Sabadell Rambla – 41.545464°N 2.109235°E
- ^map 35Sabadell Plaça Major – 41.547647°N 2.108716°E
- ^map 36Sabadell Eix Macià – 41.554987°N 2.100471°E
- ^map 37Sabadell Nord – 41.560582°N 2.096812°E
- ^map 38Sabadell Ca n'Oriac – 41.570953°N 2.089860°E

== Bibliography ==
- Salmerón i Bosch, Carles (1988). El Tren del Vallès: Història dels ferrocarrils de Barcelona a Sabadell i Terrassa [The Vallès Train: History of the Barcelona to Sabadell and Terrassa railways]. Els Trens de Catalunya-13B (in Catalan). Terminus. ISBN 84-404-3560-6.
- Memòria de Ferrocarrils de la Generalitat de Catalunya 2013 [2013 Report of Ferrocarrils de la Generalitat de Catalunya] (PDF) (Report) (in Catalan). Ferrocarrils de la Generalitat de Catalunya; Department of Public Works and Transport. Generalitat of Catalonia. 2014.
