= List of Ferrocarrils de la Generalitat de Catalunya lines =

This is a comprehensive list of all the lines operated by the Catalan government-owned Ferrocarrils de la Generalitat de Catalunya rail company, ordered by type.

== Suburban lines ==
The FGC suburban lines is the collective name given to the suburban metro network that serves the Barcelona metropolitan area and is fare-integrated with most of the other ATM transport services in the city. They're operated by Ferrocarrils de la Generalitat de Catalunya and sometimes are considered part of Rodalies Barcelona. These are all S-prefixed (after suburbà):

- S1 - Barcelona-Pl. Catalunya - Terrassa
- S2 - Barcelona-Pl. Catalunya - Sabadell Parc del Nord
- S3 - Barcelona-Pl. Espanya - Can Ros
- S4 - Barcelona-Pl. Espanya - Olesa de Montserrat
- S8 - Barcelona-Pl. Espanya - Martorell

== Rodalies lines ==
Part of the cercanías commuter train system in R-prefixed (after rodalies) just like the rest of Rodalies Barcelona lines:

- R5 and R50 - Barcelona-Pl. Espanya - Manresa
- R6 and R60 - Barcelona-Pl. Espanya - Igualada

== Barcelona Metro lines ==
These are L-prefixed, just like any other metro line in Barcelona:

- L6 - Plaça de Catalunya - Sarrià
- L7 - Plaça de Catalunya - Av. Tibidabo
- L8 - Plaça d'Espanya - Molí Nou-Ciutat Cooperativa
- L12 - Sarrià - Reina Elisenda

== Lleida-Balaguer-La Pobla de Segur line ==
- Lleida - La Pobla de Segur line.

== Bus services ==
- Can Sant Joan - Polígon Can Sant Joan
- Piera - Els Hostalets de Pierola
- Piera - Urbanitzacions de Piera
- Capellades - Capellades Estació
- Corbera bus service
- Martorell bus service
- Pallejà-Fontpineda bus service

== Funiculars ==
- Funicular de Vallvidrera
- Funicular de Gelida

== Other services ==
- Cremallera de Montserrat
- Cremallera de Núria
- Ferrocarril Turístic de l'Alt Llobregat (La Pobla de Lillet - Castellar de n'Hug)
- Ski station in La Molina

== Upcoming lines ==
- Sabadell Metro
- Terrassa Metro

== See also ==
- Metro del Baix Llobregat - Llobregat–Anoia line
- Metro del Vallès - Línia Barcelona-Vallès
