= Sarrià station =

Railway and metro station in Barcelona, Spain

Sarrià
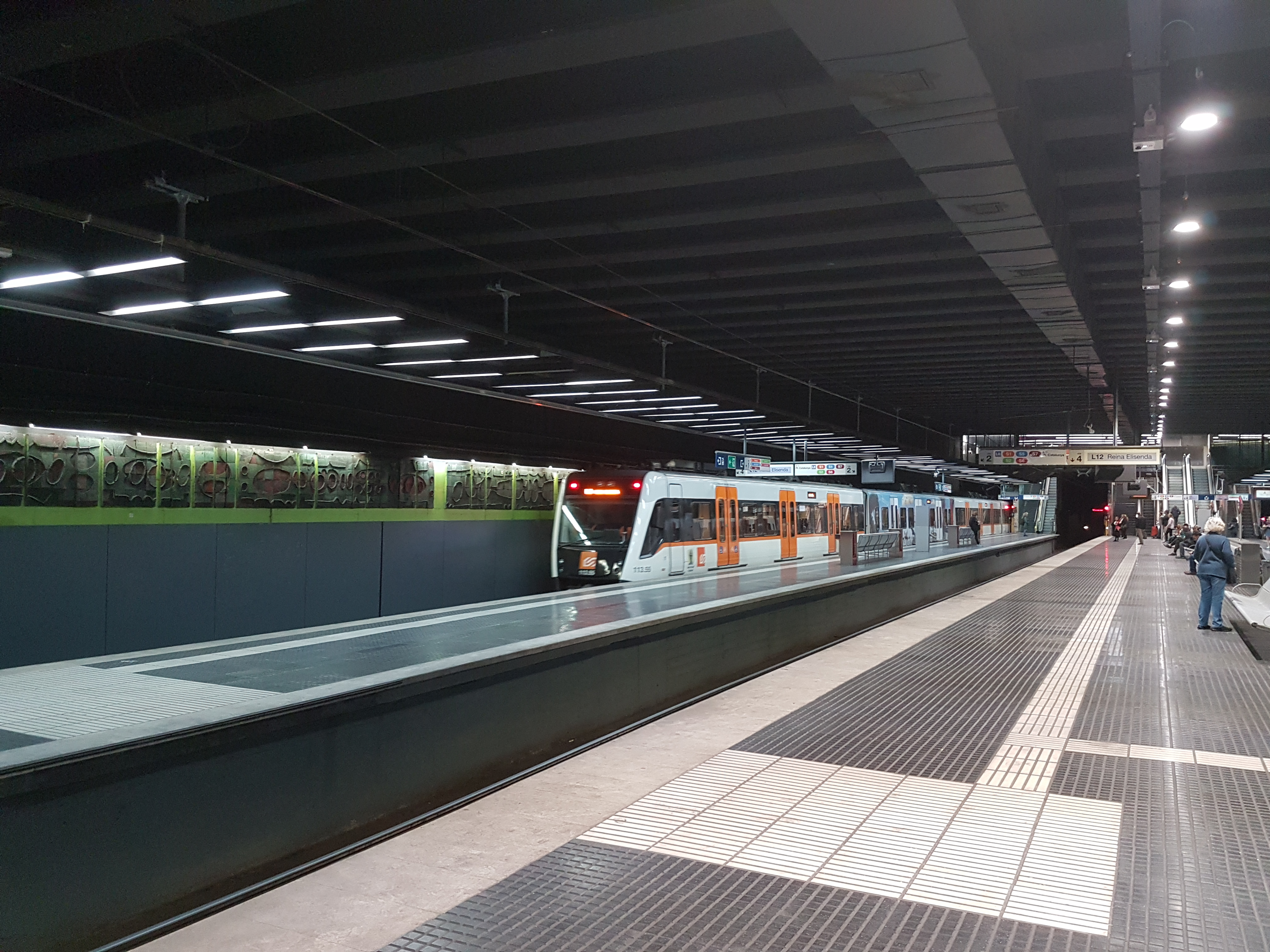

General information
- Location: Via Augusta, Barcelona
- Coordinates: 41.3986°N 2.12528°E
- System: Barcelona Metro rapid transit station Metro del Vallès commuter rail station
- Owner: Ferrocarrils de la Generalitat de Catalunya

Construction
- Structure type: Underground

Other information
- Fare zone: 1 (ATM)

History
- Opened: 1863
- Rebuilt: 1974, 2017

Passengers
- 2018: 4,284,066

Services
Preceding station	FGC	Following station
Terminus	L12	Reina Elisenda Terminus
Les Tres Torres towards Barcelona Pl. Catalunya	L6	Terminus
Les Tres Torres towards Barcelona Pl. Catalunya	S1	Peu del Funicular towards Terrassa Nacions Unides
Les Tres Torres towards Barcelona Pl. Catalunya	S2	Peu del Funicular towards Sabadell Parc del Nord
Projected
Preceding station	Metro	Following station
Prat de la Riba towards Airport T1	L9	Mandri towards Can Zam
Prat de la Riba towards Polígon Pratenc	L10	Mandri towards Gorg
Location

Sarrià (Catalan pronunciation: [səriˈa]) is a railway station located under the Via Augusta at Carrer de l'Hort de la Vila in the Sarrià neighbourhood of the Sarrià-Sant Gervasi district of Barcelona, Spain. It is served by lines L6 and L12 of the Barcelona Metro, and by lines S1 and S2 of the Metro del Vallès commuter rail system. All these lines are operated by Ferrocarrils de la Generalitat de Catalunya, who also run the station.

Sarrià station is the junction point between Barcelona Metro line L12 to Reina Elisenda, and the Metro del Vallès lines L6, S1 and S2 to Sant Cugat, Terrassa and Sabadell.

The station originally had four tracks, with three island platform between them, and three accesses. As part of making the station wheelchair-accessible, the former third track was filled in to create a single island platform for L6, S1 and S2, while L12 uses the second island platform. The two pairs of tracks join in a flat junction just to the south of the station.

The first Sarrià station opened in 1863 and was situated at ground level. The current station was opened in 1974. The station was rebuilt and made wheelchair-accessible in 2017, and it is expected to become part of the central section of TMB double line L9 & L10 by 2028.

== See also ==
- List of Barcelona Metro stations
- List of railway stations in Barcelona
