= Former municipalities of Barcelona =

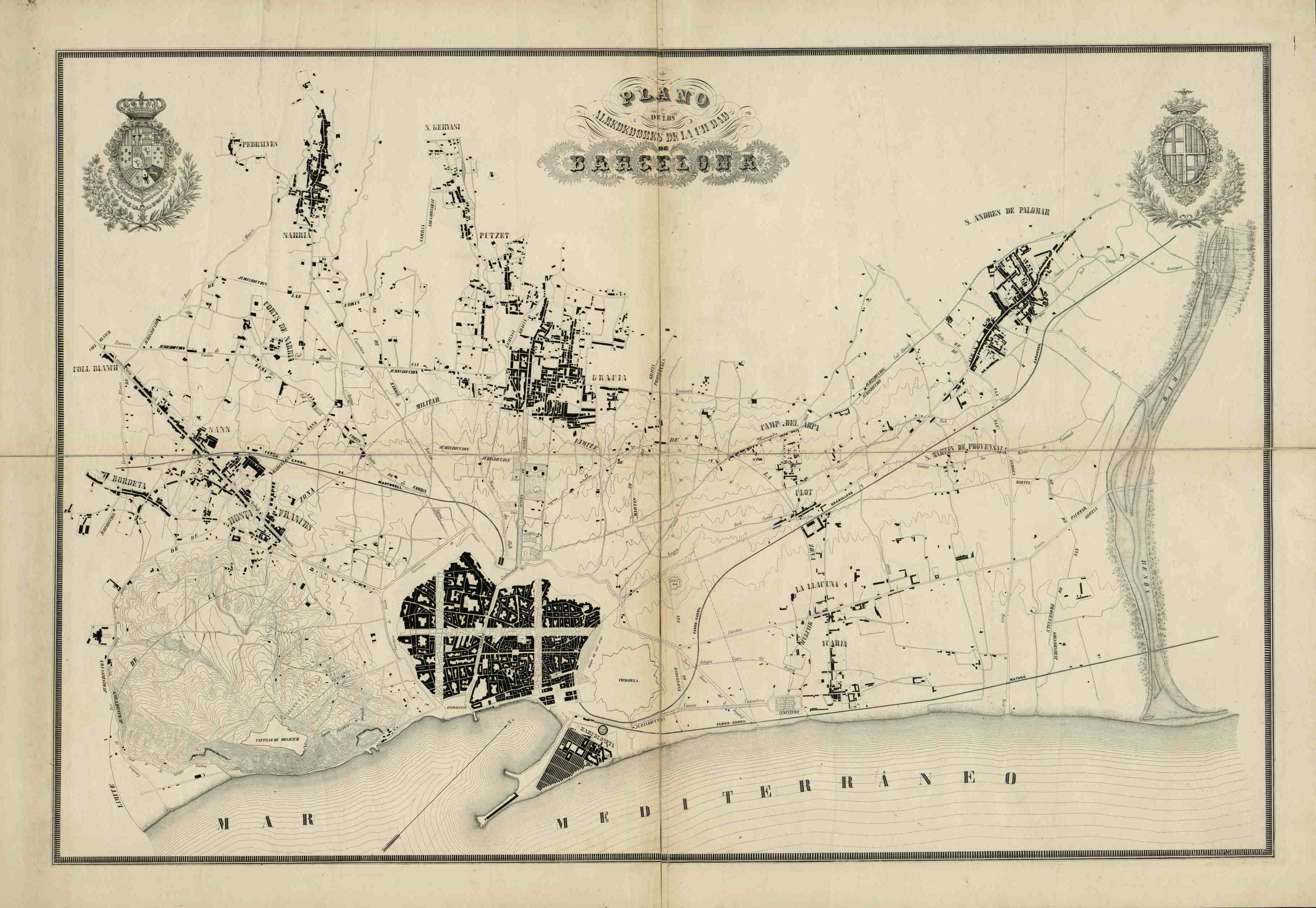
Map of Barcelona and its surroundings (1855), by Ildefons Cerdà.

The municipality of Barcelona is the result of the annexation in the late 19th and early 20th century of the different municipalities that were formerly in the plain of Barcelona.

The Nueva Planta decrees of the 18th century eliminated the autochthonous governing bodies of Catalonia, based on the representation of the different citizen branches in the Consell de Cent (Council of One Hundred), and they were replaced by absolutist bodies of royal designation. With the Cadiz Constitution of 1812, the city councils were created as bodies of popular representation and, with them, the municipalities.

At that time the city of Barcelona was what is now called Ciutat Vella. Its boundaries also included Montjuïc, the Poble Sec, and most of the territory of the later Eixample, but these were practically undeveloped lands. In 1839 an exchange with the municipality of Santa Maria de Sants incorporated the land near the Creu Coberta (today's neighborhoods of Hostafrancs and La Font de la Guatlla) to Barcelona in exchange for some land in La Marina de Port.

Throughout the 19th and 20th centuries, Barcelona annexed the rest of the municipalities of the surrounding plain. With substantial differences, the configuration of these former municipalities served to design the ten districts into which the city is currently divided.

== Former municipalities ==
Name of the municipality	Year of creation	Annexed to	Year of annexation	Current district of Barcelona	Comments
Les Corts de Sarrià	1823 1836	Barcelona	1897	Les Corts	Segregation of Sarrià.; It also included part of the territory of the Nova Esquerra de l'Eixample.; It did not include Pedralbes (in the former municipality of Sarrià).; Boundaries with Sants are in discussion
Gràcia	1821 1850	Barcelona	1897	Gràcia	Segregation of Barcelona.; It also included parts of the Eixample, Sant Gervasi-Galvany, and Baix Guinardó.; It did not include neither El Coll nor Vallcarca i els Penitents (in the former municipality of Horta).
Horta		Barcelona	1904	Horta-Guinardó	It also included El Coll, and Vallcarca i els Penitents (now belonging to Gràcia).; It did not include El Guinardó, Can Baró, la Font d'en Fargues, or parts of Baix Guinardó (in the former municipalities of Sant Martí de Provençals and Sant Andreu de Palomar).
Sant Andreu de Palomar		Barcelona	1897	Sant Andreu and Nou Barris	It also included part of Guinardó and la Font d'en Fargues (now part of Horta-Guinardó).; It did not include La Sagrera or Navas (in the former municipality of Sant Martí de Provençals).; The eastern sector of El Bon Pastor and Baró de Viver belonged to Santa Coloma de Gramenet.
Sant Gervasi de Cassoles		Barcelona	1897	Sarrià-Sant Gervasi	It included Sant Gervasi-Galvany, Sant Gervasi-La Bonanova, el Putxet i el Farró and Tibidabo.
Sant Martí de Provençals		Barcelona	1897	Sant Martí	It also included Can Baró and most of Baix Guinardó and Guinardó (now belonging to Horta-Guinardó).; It also included Sagrera and Navas (now belonging to Sant Andreu).; It also included most of the Sagrada Familia and part of Fort Pienc (now part of the Eixample).
Santa Maria de Sants		Barcelona	1897	Sants-Montjuïc	It did not include Montjuic or the Poble Sec (in the municipality of Barcelona).; In 1839, Hostafrancs and Font de la Guatlla were also ceded to Barcelona in exchange for parts of La Marina de Port.; Most of the Zona Franca belonged to the municipality of L'Hospitalet de Llobregat.
Sarrià		Barcelona	1921	Sarrià-Sant Gervasi	It included Sarrià and most of Les Tres Torres.; It also included Pedralbes (now part of Les Corts).; Until its segregation, it also included the municipality of Les Corts de Sarrià.; In 1892 it incorporated the former municipality of Vallvidrera.; In 1916 it incorporated part of the former municipality of Santa Creu d'Olorda.
Vallvidrera		Sarrià	1892	Sarrià-Sant Gervasi	Included Vallvidrera and les Planes

== See also ==
- History of Barcelona
- Urban planning of Barcelona
- Districts of Barcelona
- Street names in Barcelona
