= Gervasi =

Gervasi may refer to:

== Places ==
- Sarrià-Sant Gervasi, one of the biggest districts in the north-west of Barcelona, Catalonia (Spain).
- Sant Gervasi – Galvany, a neighborhood in the Sarrià-Sant Gervasi district of Barcelona
- Sant Gervasi – la Bonanova, a neighborhood in the Sarrià-Sant Gervasi district of Barcelona

== People ==
- David Gervasi (born 1983), Swiss decathlete
- Frank Gervasi (1908–1990), American foreign correspondent and author
- Luigi Gervasi, Italian set decorator active in the 1950s and 1960s
- Sacha Gervasi (born 1966), British-American filmmaker
