= La Maternitat i Sant Ramon =

Coordinates: 41°23′3.63″N 2°7′19.94″E

- Neighborhood of Barcelona
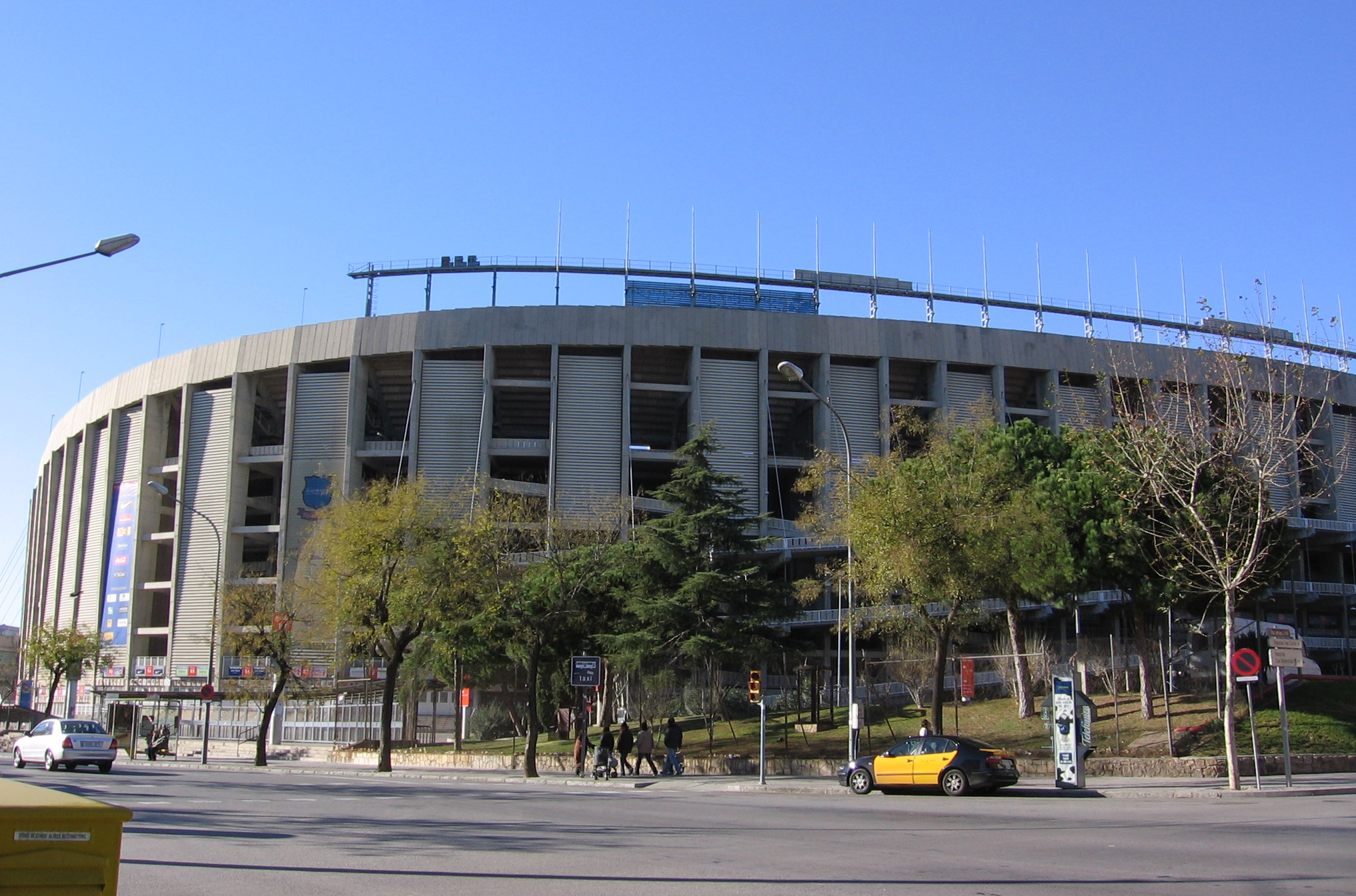
- Camp Nou
- Interactive map of La Maternitat i Sant Ramon
- Country: Spain
- Autonomous community: Catalonia
- Province: Barcelona
- Comarca: Barcelonès
- Municipality: Barcelona
- District: Les Corts

Area
  - Total: 1.903 km^{2} (0.735 sq mi)

Population
  - Total: 23,868
  - Density: 12,540/km^{2} (32,480/sq mi)

La Maternitat i Sant Ramon (Catalan pronunciation: [lə mətərniˈtat i ˌsan rəˈmon]) is a neighborhood in the les Corts district of Barcelona, Catalonia (Spain), the westernmost area of the district, distinctly more working class than its neighbours Pedralbes and Les Corts and similar to the also neighbouring L'Hospitalet de Llobregat and Sants. It was part of the former independent municipality of Les Corts, also known as les Corts de Sarrià. Its name stems from the 19th century maternity house known as La Maternitat, in Travessera de Les Corts, designed by Camil Oliveres i Gensana and which includes a large garden. It is made up of residential areas to the west such as Sant Ramon proper and the Torre Melina buildings, and the built-up areas of La Maternitat and Can Bacardí to the east. Centre Cívic Riera Blanca is this neighbourhood's community centre.

Most of the facilities of FC Barcelona, including its stadium Camp Nou, are located in this neighbourhood.

The Malian-Spanish footballer Adama Traoré was born here.

== Transport ==
The Barcelona Metro stations Les Corts and Zona Universitària, on L3, are both nearby. Camp Nou, a L9 station still under construction, will serve the neighbourhood. On the other hand, Trambaix station Can Ramon links it with the Baix Llobregat municipalities to the west and inner-city Barcelona to the east.
