= Sarrià, Barcelona =

Coordinates: 41°23′57.95″N 2°7′18.72″E

Sarrià
- Neighborhood of Barcelona
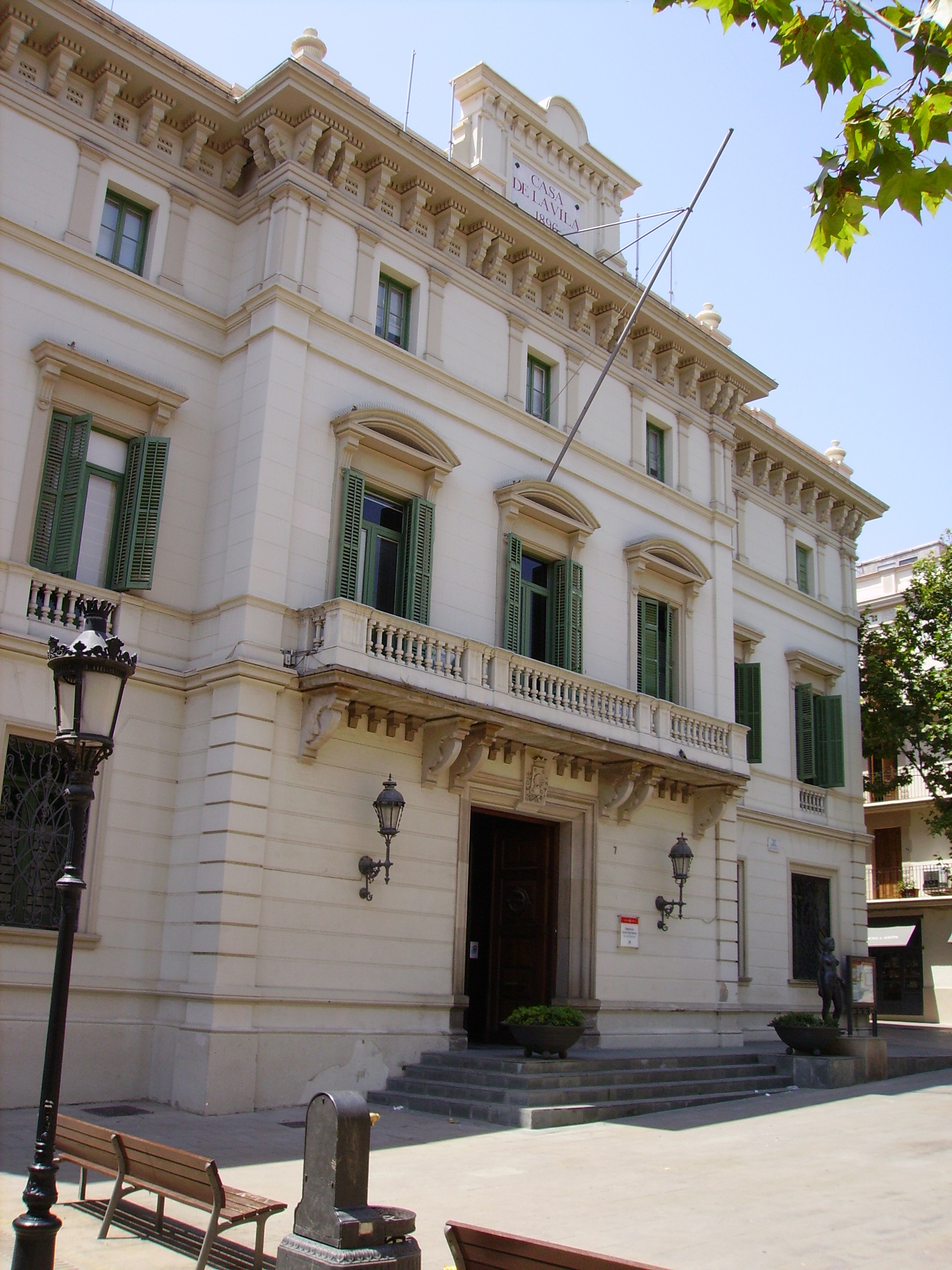
- Former casa de la Vila de Sarrià (Sarrià town hall)

- Coat of arms
- Interactive map of Sarrià
- Country: Spain
- Autonomous community: Catalonia
- Province: Barcelona
- Comarca: Barcelonès
- Municipality: Barcelona
- District: Sarrià-Sant Gervasi

Area
  - Total: 3.042 km^{2} (1.175 sq mi)

Population
  - Total: 24,810
  - Density: 8,156/km^{2} (21,120/sq mi)

Sarrià (Catalan pronunciation: [səriˈa], Spanish: [saˈrja]) is a neighborhood in the Sarrià-Sant Gervasi district of Barcelona, Catalonia, Spain. Its main street is Major de Sarrià.

== Former municipality ==
Today what was the old municipality is divided into various neighborhoods and districts. Most are in the district of Sarrià-Sant Gervasi, the neighborhoods of Sarrià and les Tres Torres, two small areas in the neighborhoods of Sant Gervasi - la Bonanova and Sant Gervasi - Galvany. Vallvidrera independent town but was added to Sarrià in the 1890. The neighborhood of Pedralbes was also part of the old town before local boundaries were redrawn in 1984, but is currently included in the district of les Corts.

== Communications ==
In 1858 Sarrià was connected to Barcelona by a railway line, which today forms a part of the conurbation's urban metro system, part of the Catalonia Railway company.

== Education ==
The preschool through lower secondary campus of Istituto Italiano Statale Comprensivo di Barcellona, an Italian international school, is in Sarrià.
