= Domènec Balet i Nadal =

Catalan master builder (1844–1915)

- Born: 15 June 1844; Barcelona
- Died: February 1915 (aged 70); Barcelona
- Occupation: Mestre d'obres

Domènec Balet i Nadal (Barcelona, 15 June 1844 – Barcelona, February 1915), also documented in Spanish as Domingo Balet Nadal, was a Catalan mestre d'obres (Note: In 19th-century Catalonia, a mestre d'obres (Spanish: maestro de obras) was a professional qualified by the Escola de Mestres d'Obres (School of Master Builders) to design and direct building works; the qualification was distinct from that of an architect.) active in Barcelona in the late nineteenth and early twentieth centuries. He designed housing in the Eixample, industrial and commercial buildings, and won a medal in the architecture section of the 1893 World's Columbian Exposition in Chicago.

== Biography ==
Born in Barcelona, he was the son of Josep Balet i Manubens and Maria Nadal i Sorribas. As a student at the Escola de Belles Arts de Barcelona (Barcelona School of Fine Arts), he won a copper medal for linear drawing in the 1863–1864 academic year, and a silver medal and an analogous work in topography in 1864–1865. In 1863–1864 he appears on the same list of prizewinning students as Rafael Guastavino. He obtained the title of mestre d'obres on 5 August 1869, at the School of Master Builders, which depended on the Academy of Fine Arts of Barcelona and operated until 1871. His final project at the School, dated 1868, was a design for pigsties for a herd of 300 pigs, consisting of four plans and a budget, which is held in the Graphic Archive of the Barcelona School of Architecture (Escola Tècnica Superior d'Arquitectura de Barcelona).

According to the directory compiled by Joan Bassegoda i Nonell, he was an active member of the Centre de Mestres d'Obres de Barcelona (Centre of Master Builders of Barcelona) between 1871 and 1916, and has projects in the Obres Particulars (Private Works) and Foment (Development) archives of Barcelona and in those of Sarrià and Sant Gervasi. At the general meeting of 26 December 1873, the Centre de Mestres d'Obres de Catalunya elected him vocal adjunt (deputy member) of its board for 1874.

In January 1876 he was one of the three decorators, together with Macari Planella and Tiberi Sabater, of the artistic-industrial exhibition of the Centre de Mestres d'Obres, where he presented the Vilumara house on the Passeig de Gràcia (1872) and the "Teatro Español".

In 1877 the Ateneu Barcelonès awarded him the prize for the cerrajería (ironwork) subject in its drawing competition, for a design of chandeliers and torch-holders (Spanish: arañas y hachones) for a Gothic church, submitted under the motto "Nova et Veritas".

In 1888 he directed the German section of the 1888 Barcelona Universal Exposition.

In 1893 he took part in the World's Columbian Exposition in Chicago with a group of projects; the official catalogue mistakenly lists him as "Dalet, Domingo". He was awarded a prize in the section Architecture as a Fine Art and the official list of prizewinning Spanish exhibitors includes him as "Balet (Domingo)". The catalogue of the Segunda Exposición General de Bellas Artes de Barcelona (1894) describes him as "premiado con Medalla de oro en la Exposición de Chicago" ("awarded a gold medal at the Chicago Exposition").

He took part in the general fine arts exhibitions of Barcelona in 1891, 1894 and 1896, the year in which he presented the ceiling and the curtain of the Liceu theatre, the Vilumara pantheon and the Villa Planas; his son, the architect Josep Balet i Duran, also exhibited two projects there.

He died in Barcelona in mid-February 1915; the funeral left on 17 February from the house of mourning at Carrer dels Tallers, 68 bis. The next day La Veu de Catalunya published his obituary.

== Works ==
| Work | Location | Year | Notes |
|---|---|---|---|
| Casa Vilumara | Passeig de Gràcia, former no. 66, Barcelona | 1872 | Demolished. One of the "houses of the Teatre Espanyol". |
| Casa Pere Llibre | Passeig de Gràcia, 24, Barcelona | 1872 | Neo-Mudéjar; restored by Pere Bassegoda i Mateu (1899). Bé Cultural d'Interès Local (BCIL; (Note: A category of local-level heritage protection in Catalonia (Catalan: Bé Cultural d'Interès Local, "Cultural Asset of Local Interest").) registry 15282-I, agreement of the City Council plenary of 26 May 2000). |
| Seat of the Banca Crèdit i Docks (now the Museu de Cera de Barcelona, the Barcelona wax museum) | Passatge de la Banca, Barcelona | 1873; raised 1892 | Commissioned by Cristòfor Taltabull; raising of the building for the Caixa Vilumara. |
| Thermal power station of the Sociedad Española de Electricidad (Les Tres Xemeneies, "the Three Chimneys") | Paral·lel, Barcelona | 1883 | With the engineer Narcís Xifra i Masmitjà. |
| Magatzems El Siglo (El Siglo department store) | Rambla, Barcelona | 1881 | Execution of the works and of the installation, to a design by Eduardo Puerto. |
| Ceiling of the auditorium and curtain of the Gran Teatre del Liceu (project) | Barcelona | 1893 | Presented in Chicago. |
| Building of the printing house of the Successors of N. Ramírez i Cia., later Henrich i Cia. (Impremta de Narcís Ramírez) | Carrer de Còrsega, 344–352 (Barcelona) | 1886 | Factory and graphic arts workshops. In 1885 Manuel Henrich applied there for permission to install a photographic laboratory and studio, with Balet as mestre d'obres. Remodelled by Joan Baptista Feu i Puig around 1910 and demolished. Presented in Chicago. |
| Summer theatre of the Nuevo Retiro | Barcelona | 1889 | Built by Balet, according to the catalogue of the Primera Exposición General de Bellas Artes de Barcelona (no. 1116). |
| Dining room and chimney of the Villa Fabra (Cal Marquès) | Alella | before 1891 | Residence of Camil Fabra i Fontanills, Marquis of Alella. Construido bajo la dirección del expositor ("Built under the direction of the exhibitor"); exhibited in 1891 (no. 1114). |
| Oratory and dining room of the house of Andrés Anglada | Barcelona | before 1891 | Construidos bajo la dirección del expositor ("Built under the direction of the exhibitor"); exhibited in 1891 (no. 1117). |
| Villa Planas (Torre Vermella) | Cerdanyola del Vallès | c. 1893 | Presented in Chicago as "Villa Planas en Cerdañola". |
| Vilumara family pantheon | Poblenou Cemetery, Barcelona | before 1893 | Neo-Egyptian style. Presented in Chicago. |
| Rusiñol family pantheon | Via de Santa Eulàlia, grouping 3a, 16, Cementiri del Sud-oest (Southwest Cemetery), Barcelona | 1892–1893 | Acquired by the brothers Albert, Josep and Santiago Rusiñol; angel by the sculptor Enric Clarasó. The municipal file dates from 1892 and Cementiris de Barcelona dates the work to 1893. |
| Villa Faura (project) | Sant Pere de Torelló | 1894 | Project presented at the Segunda Exposición General de Bellas Artes de Barcelona (nos. 1144–1145). |
| Casa Puig | Ronda – Carrer de Pau Claris, Barcelona | 1896 | |
| Casa Josep Portabella | Corts, 242, Barcelona | 1893–1896 | Bassegoda dates it to 1893 and Arquitectura moderna de Barcelona to 1896. |
| Portabella pantheon | Cementiri del Sud-oest, Barcelona | 1895 | |
| La Unión Metalúrgica factory | Carrer de Sancho de Àvila (formerly Vilanova), Barcelona | 1898 | Factory of Dionisio Bobín; extended by Josep Plantada (1908–1914). |
| Santa Maria de Montalegre | Barcelona | 1901–1902 | Collaboration with August Font i Carreras. |

== Bibliography ==
- Bassegoda Nonell, Juan (1973). Los maestros de obras de Barcelona (in Spanish) (2nd ed.). Barcelona: Editores Técnicos Asociados.
