= Sant Gervasi de Cassoles =

Former municipality in Barcelona, Spain

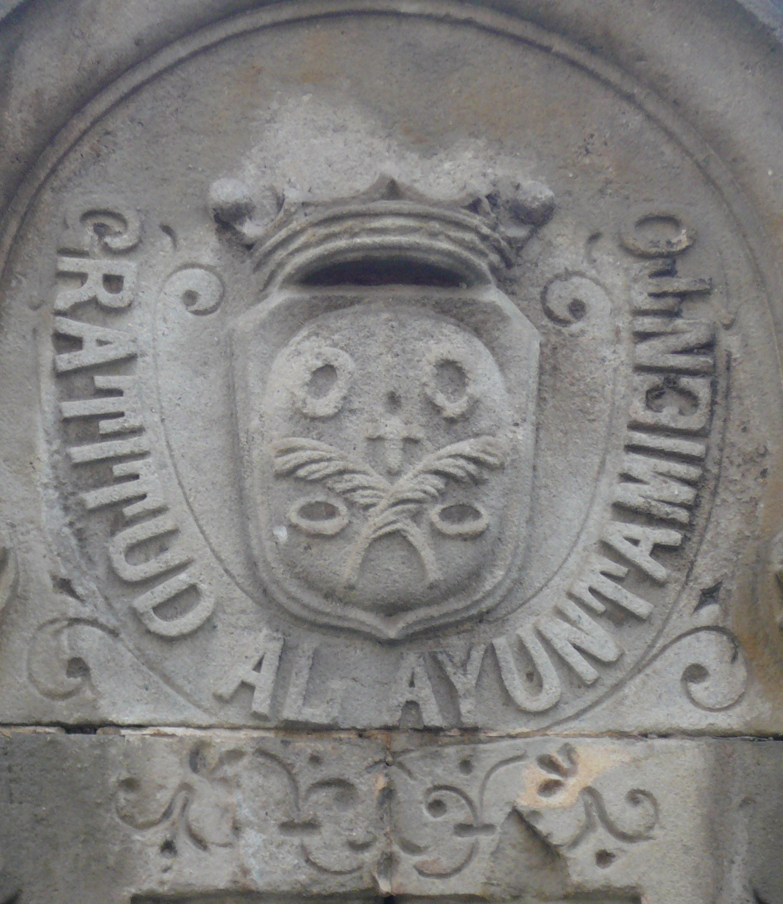
Coat of arms of Sant Gervasi belonging to the fountain in the plaça de Molina. This coat, with the palms of the martyrdom of Sant Gervasi and Sant Protasi and four cassoles, was used until 1854, when it was substituted by one that had single houses and no cassoles.

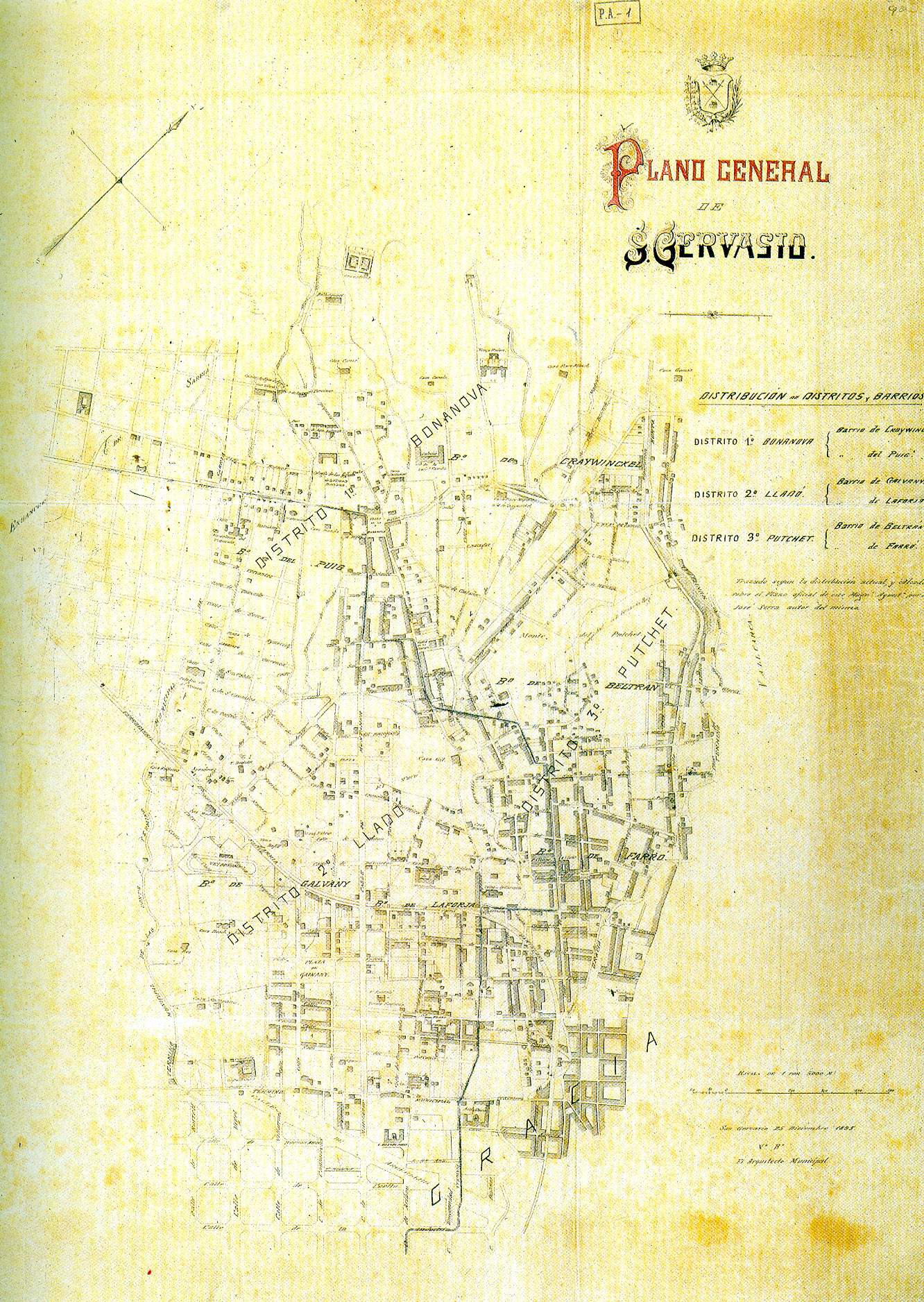
Plan of Sant Gervasi (1895).

The former municipality of Sant Gervasi de Cassoles (in Spanish, San Gervasio de Cassolas), annexed to Barcelona in 1897, extended over a large part of the former district III of Barcelona, to the northwest of the city, between the municipalities, also formerly independent, of Sarrià, Les Corts de Sarrià, Gràcia and Horta.

Currently the old nucleus of Sant Gervasi de Cassoles is divided into two neighborhoods of the district of Sarrià-Sant Gervasi called: Sant Gervasi-La Bonanova and Sant Gervasi-Galvany. The oldest and most central part of Sant Gervasi de Cassoles is located in the district of Sant Gervasi - la Bonanova, in the Sant Gervasi sector of this district, and in Sant Gervasi-Galvany is the lowest part of the old municipality.

The name of Sant Gervasi de Cassoles corresponds to the invocation of a primitive rural chapel or church, named already in 987 (actually, the invocation was to the saints Gervasi and Protasi, twin martyrs). The origin of Cassoles is more uncertain, being able to come from:

- From a derivative of "isolated houses" (cases aïllades) added to "soles" (the fogatge — direct tax created by Peter IV of Aragon— of 1359 there were only seven houses). Thus, it would be a contraction of isolated houses + soles: cassoles.
- Of the possible existence of brickworks who made cassoles.
- Of casules (small houses, which were named as cassoles by the rector Gaietà Llaró, when answering in 1789 to the questionnaire made by Francisco de Zamora).

In 1789 most of the houses were isolated masies surrounded by woods, fields and vines; crops were mainly rainfed and there were six pairs of oxen to till the land; the main farms were wheat, barley and millet.

The chapel of Saints Gervasius and Protasius has kept its original location (where the Bonanova church is), and until the 18th century the main dedication, since an altar was added with an image of the Mare de Déu dels Afortunats or Bonanova, which displaced the cult of the twin saints.

The primitive nucleus of the village was formed around the church and the road that led to it (today's Sant Gervasi de Cassoles street).

== Demographics ==
Historical population

Year	Pop.	±%
1842	376	—
1857	2,121	+464.1%

Year	Pop.	±%
1860	2,512	+18.4%
1877	4,826	+92.1%

Year	Pop.	±%
1887	7,032	+45.7%

Between the 1897 Census and the previous one, this municipality disappears because it becomes part of the municipality 08019 (Barcelona).
- 1842, 1877, and 1887: De jure population according to the population census of the National Statistics Institute (Spain)
- 1857 and 1860: De facto population according to the population census of the National Statistics Institute (Spain).

== See also ==
- Former municipalities of Barcelona
