= La Bonanova station =

Railway station situated in the Sarrià-Sant Gervasi district of Barcelona

La Bonanova
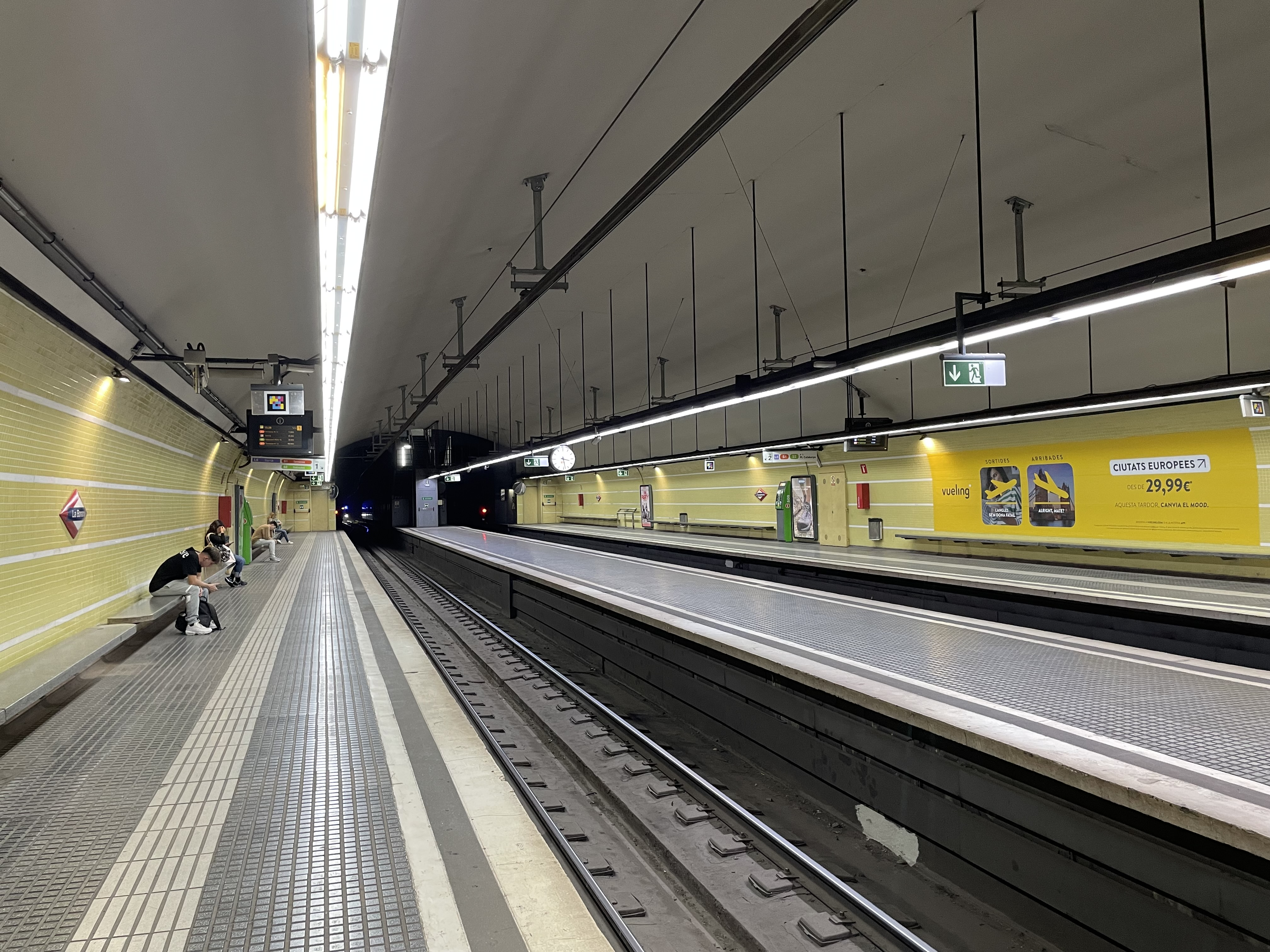

General information
- Location: Via Augusta, Barcelona
- Coordinates: 41.3978°N 2.13528°E
- System: Barcelona Metro rapid transit station Metro del Vallès commuter rail station
- Owner: Ferrocarrils de la Generalitat de Catalunya
- Platforms: 4 (in Barcelona solution configuration)
- Tracks: 2

Construction
- Structure type: Underground

Other information
- Fare zone: 1 (ATM)

History
- Opened: 1887
- Rebuilt: 1952

Passengers
- 2018: 913,189

Services
Preceding station	FGC	Following station
Muntaner towards Barcelona Pl. Catalunya	S1	Les Tres Torres towards Terrassa Nacions Unides
Muntaner towards Barcelona Pl. Catalunya	S2	Les Tres Torres towards Sabadell Parc del Nord
Muntaner towards Barcelona Pl. Catalunya	L6	Les Tres Torres towards Sarrià
Location

La Bonanova (Catalan pronunciation: [lə ˌβɔnəˈnɔβə]) is a railway station situated under the Via Augusta at Carrer de Ganduxer in the Sarrià-Sant Gervasi district of Barcelona. It is served by line L6 of the Barcelona Metro and lines S1 and S2 of the Metro del Vallès commuter rail system. All these lines are operated by Ferrocarrils de la Generalitat de Catalunya, who also run the station.

The station has twin tracks, with two side platforms and a central island platform. The side platforms are used for boarding, whilst the central platform is used for alighting, a configuration that is known as the Barcelona solution. In the case of La Bonanova, the centre platform is long enough to accommodate a four car train, but the side platforms are shorter, meaning that it is only possible to board three of the train's cars from them.

The station platforms are accessed by a single ticket hall at the western end of the station, which has street accesses to both sides the Via Augusta. A second hall at the east end of the station exists, but is now used only as an emergency exit.

The line on which La Bonanova is located opened in 1863, but the first station on the site did not open until 1887. The current station was opened in 1952, when the line through the station was put underground.

== See also ==
- List of Barcelona Metro stations
- List of railway stations in Barcelona
