= Anne-Marie La Bonnardière =

- Born: 1906
- Died: 1998 (aged 91–92)

Academic background
- Education: Catholic University of Lyon; CNRS

Academic work
- Discipline: Religious studies; Late antiquity
- Institutions: CNRS
- Notable works: Biblia augustiniana

Anne-Marie La Bonnardière (1906–1998) was a scholar of St Augustine, known for her work on the influence of the bible on St Augustine's writing.

== Career ==
Anne-Marie La Bonnardière studied at the Catholic University of Lyon, receiving a degree in Geography and History. She worked at a secondary school in Lyon until it was closed due to the outbreak of the Second World War, after which she moved to teach at the Lycée Français de Barcelone. In Barcelona, she began her research into St. Augustine, benefiting from the library at the Santa Maria de Montserrat Abbey. In 1947, she returned to France, joining the CNRS in Paris in 1947, working with H.-I. Marrou. She defended her first thesis, 'Recherches de chronologie augustinienne' in 1964, and her second, on the Book of Wisdom in Augustine's writing, in 1970.

== Scholarship ==
La Bonnardière's work focused on the influence of the bible on the writings of St Augustine, and made possible the dating of many of Augustine's works. Her research incorporated the historical and social context of St Augustine's work and early Christianity in North Africa. Much of this work was published in volumes under the title Biblia Augustiniana.

She also contributed significantly to projects on the prosopography of late antiquity. Her archives are stored at the library of Sources Chrétiennes.

== Selected publications ==
- (1965). Recherches de chronologie augustinienne. Paris, Etudes Augustiniennes.
- (1967). Biblia Augustiniana, A.T.: le Deutéronome. Paris, Et́udes Augustiniennes.
- (1970). Biblia Augustiniana, A.T.: le livre de la sagesse. Paris, Et́udes Augustiniennes.
- (1971). 'La Livre de la Sagesse dans l'oeuvre de saint Augustin.' Revue Des Etudes Augustiniennes, (17), 171–175.
- (1972). Biblia augustiniana, A.T.: le livre de Jérémie. Paris, Études augustiniennes.
- (1975). Biblia Augustiniana. A.T.: le livre des proverbes. Paris, Études augustiniennes.
- (1976). 'Les "Enarrationes in psalmos" prêchées par saint Augustin à Carthage en décembre 409.' Recherches Augustiniennes, (9), 52–90.
- (1977). 'L'interprétation augustinienne du magnum sacramentum de Éphés 5, 32.' Recherches Augustiniennes Et Patristiques. 12, 3-45.
- (1983). 'La date des sermons 151 à 156 de saint Augustin.' Revue d'Études Augustiniennes et Patristiques. 29, 129–136.
- ed. (1986). Bible de tous les temps. III. Saint Augustine et la bible. Paris: Beauchesne.
