= Liceo Cervantes =

Liceo Cervantes may refer to:

- Liceo Español Cervantes in Rome, Italy
- Liceo Miguel de Cervantes y Saavedra, in Santiago de Chile
