= Oreneta Park =

Park in Barcelona, Spain

Oreneta Park or the Castell de l'Oreneta Park is a large wooded area in the Pedralbes region of Barcelona city. The park was opened to the public in 1978. It is representative of the original Mediterranean vegetation, with many species characteristic of the high plateaux around Barcelona.

The Centre de Estudis de Modelisme Vapor (Centre for studies of Steam models) has maintained a small steam train ride in the park since 1998.
