= Vallvidrera, el Tibidabo i les Planes =

Coordinates: 41°25′00″N 2°05′41″E

- Neighborhood of Barcelona
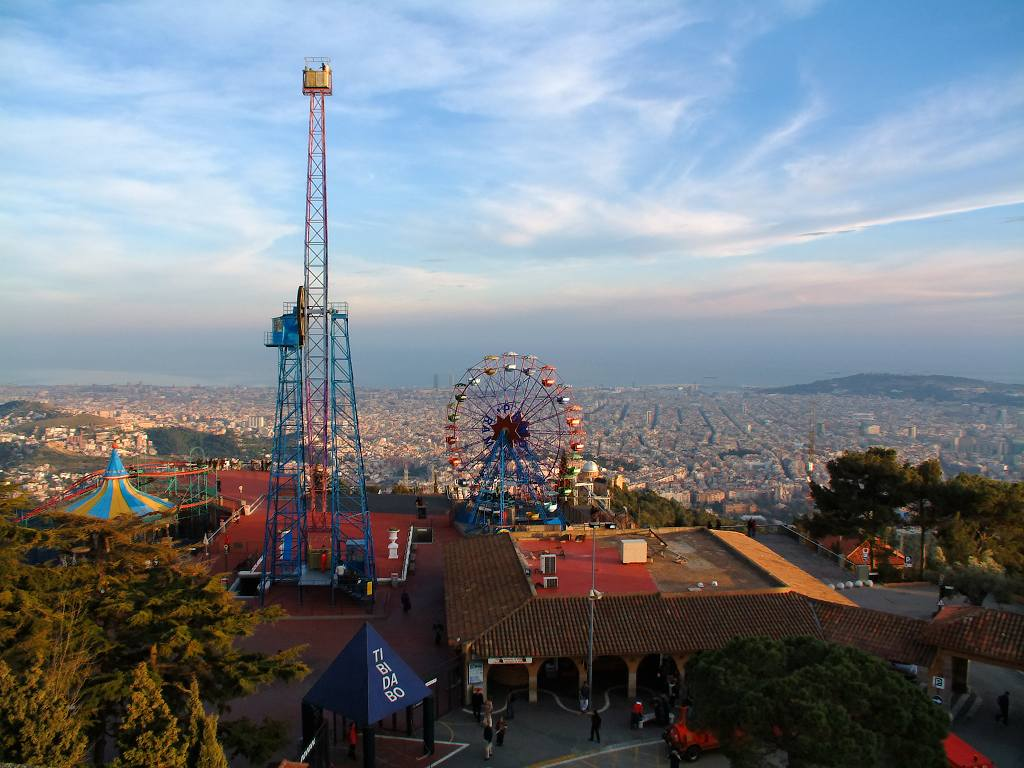
- Tibidabo Amusement Park
- Interactive map of Vallvidrera, el Tibidabo i les Planes
- Country: Spain
- Autonomous community: Catalonia
- Province: Barcelona
- Comarca: Barcelonès
- Municipality: Barcelona
- District: Sarrià-Sant Gervasi

Area
  - Total: 11.522 km^{2} (4.449 sq mi)

Population
  - Total: 4,641
  - Density: 402.8/km^{2} (1,043/sq mi)

Vallvidrera, el Tibidabo i les Planes (Catalan pronunciation: [ˌbaʎβiˈðɾeɾə əl tiβiˈðaβuj ləs ˈplanəs]) is a neighborhood in the Sarrià-Sant Gervasi district of Barcelona, Catalonia, Spain. It is formed by three areas: Vallvidrera (that was a former municipality added to Sarrià), Tibidabo and les Planes.

== Transport ==
- FGC station Les Planes.
