= Plain of Barcelona =

Coordinates: 41°24′11″N 2°10′50″E

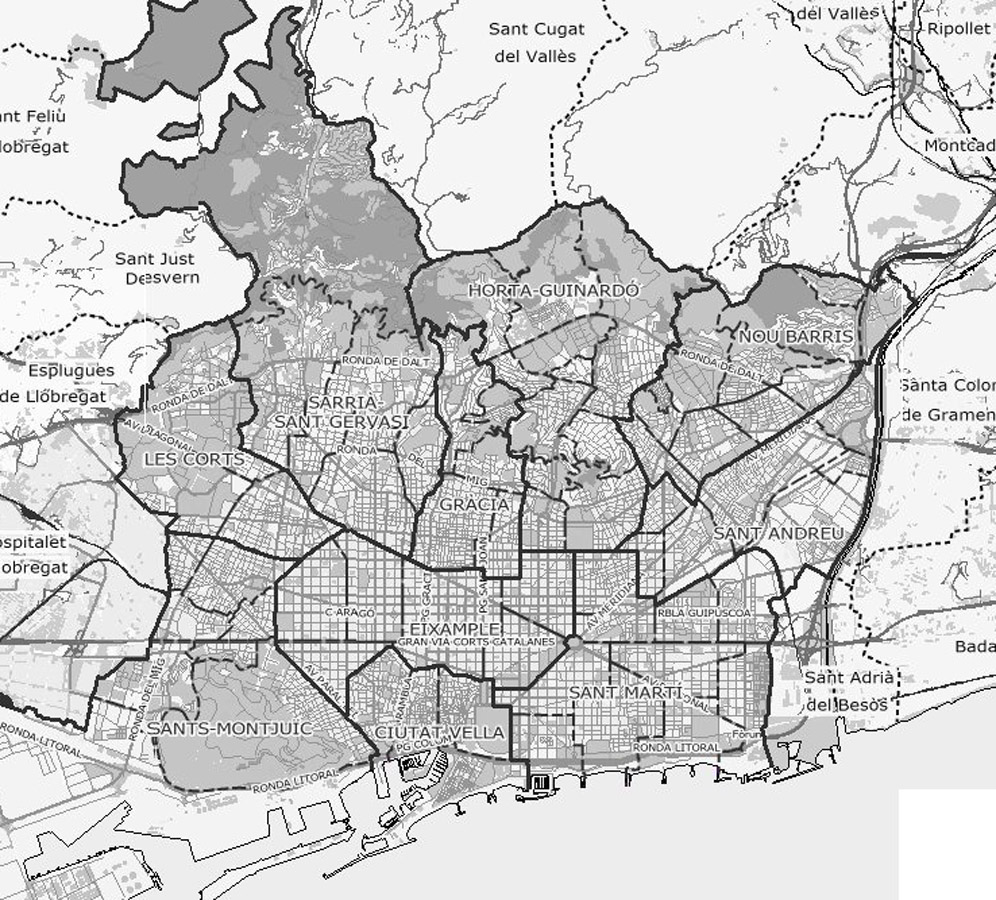
Map of Barcelona

Evolution of the coastline in the district of Ciutat Vella

The plain of Barcelona (Catalan: Pla de Barcelona) is a plain located in the county of Barcelonès, in Catalonia, Spain. It borders the Mediterranean Sea, the Serra de Collserola mountain range, and the river deltas of the Llobregat and Besòs. Its geographical location is between 41° 16' and 41° 30' north latitude and between 1° 54' and 2° 18' east longitude. With a surface area of 102.16 km², the plain is about 11 km long and 6 km wide.

Traditionally, this was the name given to the area between the old city of Barcelona and the foothills of the Serra de Collserola mountain range (the hills of El Turó de la Peira, Turó de la Rovira, Turó del Carmel, Turó de la Creueta del Coll, Turó del Putxet, and Turó de Monterols).

The plain of Barcelona is located on a fault line that runs from Montgat to Garraf and that originated in the Paleozoic era. The terrain is formed by slate substrates and granite formations, as well as clay and calcareous rock. In the past, the coast was made up of tidal marshes and lagoons, which disappeared gradually as the coastline advanced due to the sediment carried by the rivers and streams that flowed into the beach. It has been estimated that the coastline has advanced about 5 km since the 6th century BC. The plain was previously criss-crossed by numerous torrents and streams, which were grouped into three fluvial sectors: the Riera de Horta stream in the area near the Besòs river (or eastern area); the Riera Blanca stream and the Torrent Gornal stream in the area of the Llobregat river (or western area); and, in the central area of the plain, a group of streams coming from the southern slope of the Tibidabo hill, such as the Riera de Sant Gervasi, Riera de Vallcarca, Riera de Magòria, and Riera de Collserola streams.

The climate is Mediterranean, with mild winters thanks to the characteristics of the terrain that shelter the plain from the north winds. Temperature usually ranges between 9.5 °C and 24.3 °C, on average. Rainfall is low, about 600 mm per year, and most of the precipitation occurs in spring and autumn. This shortage meant that, in the past, heavy work had to be carried out to supply water to the city, including wells, canals, and irrigation channels. The vegetation of the area consists mainly of pine and oak, and undergrowth of heather, laurustine, strawberry trees, and vines. In the past, both dryland farming and irrigated agriculture were practiced—mainly in vineyards and cereal fields—although today almost the entire area is covered by buildings.

The plain remained an agricultural area until the 19th century, since the city was enclosed within its walls and the adjoining land was designated for its protection. This led to a large increase in population density, which entailed serious public health risks, until 1854, when the walls were torn down, and the expansion of the city began. This came about thanks to the new urban perimeter expansion plan designed by Ildefons Cerdà. Nowadays, the Eixample district occupies a large part of the plain of Barcelona.

== See also ==
- Urban planning of Barcelona
- Districts of Barcelona
- Street names in Barcelona
- History of Barcelona
- Former municipalities of Barcelona

== Bibliography ==
- Carreras i Verdaguer, Carles (1993). Geografia urbana de Barcelona: espai mediterrani, temps europeu (in Catalan). Barcelona: Oikos-Tau. ISBN 84-281-0802-1.
- Gausa Navarro, Manuel (2021). "Barcelona: Haec Omnia – Divisa – Tibi Dabo. Cohesión y división en la evolución (geo)urbana de una ciudad ambivalentemente compacta". Astrágalo. Cultura de la Arquitectura y de la Ciudad. (in Spanish) (29). Seville: Editorial Universidad de Sevilla: 259–292. doi:10.12795/astragalo.2021.i29.14. hdl:11567/1079694. ISSN 1134-3672.
- Garizurieta Badiola, Marga; Barinagarrementeria, María Dolores; Sola Muñoz, Carmen (2003). Diccionario de geografía (in Spanish). Éditions Larousse. ISBN 9788483323885.
- Giralt i Radigales, Jesús M., ed. (1996). Enciclopèdia Catalana Bàsica (in Catalan). Barcelona: Enciclopèdia Catalana. ISBN 9788482563633.
- Giralt i Radigales, Jesús M.; Alberch i Fugueras, Ramon, eds. (2005). Enciclopèdia de Barcelona Vol. 1 (in Catalan). Barcelona: Enciclopèdia Catalana. ISBN 84-412-1395-X.
- Guardia, Manel; Rosselló, Maribel; Garriga, Sergi (August 2014). "Barcelona's water supply, 1867–1967: the transition to a modern system". Urban History. 41 (3). Cambridge: Cambridge University Press: 415–434. ISSN 1469-8706.
- Riera-Mora, Santiago; Esteban-Amat, A. (February 1994). "Vegetation history and human activity during the last 6000 years on the central Catalan coast (northeastern Iberian Peninsula)". Vegetation History and Archaeobotany. 3 (1). London: Springer Nature: 7–23. doi:10.1007/BF00208885. ISSN 0939-6314.
- Sobrequés i Callicó, Jaume, ed. (1991). Història de Barcelona 1. La ciutat antiga (in Catalan). Barcelona: City Council of Barcelona. ISBN 9788477391791.
