= Les Tres Torres station =

Railway station in Barcelona, Spain

Les Tres Torres
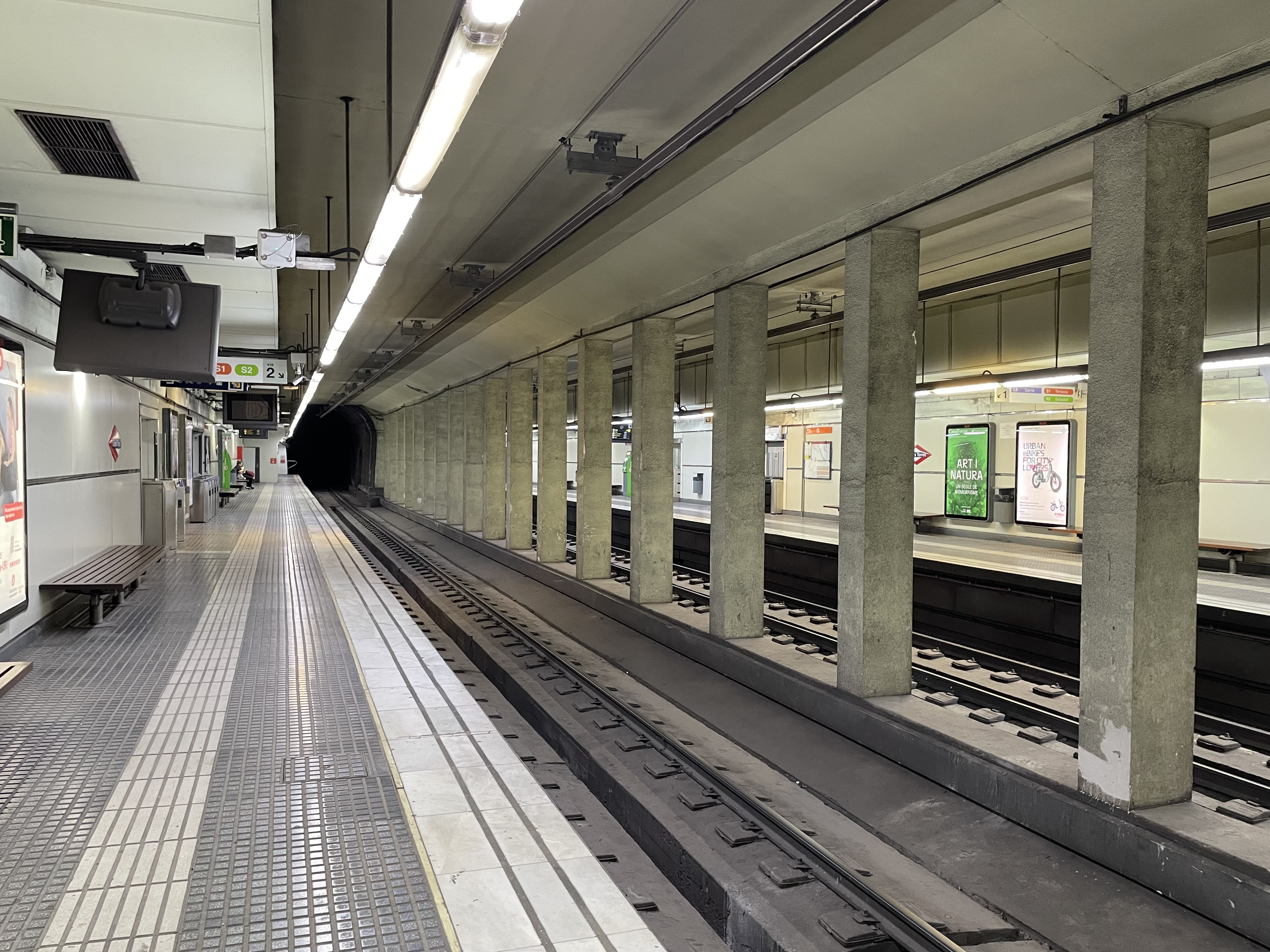

General information
- Location: Via Augusta, Barcelona
- Coordinates: 41°23′51″N 2°7′50″E
- System: Barcelona Metro rapid transit station Metro del Vallès commuter rail station
- Owner: Ferrocarrils de la Generalitat de Catalunya
- Platforms: 2 side platforms
- Tracks: 2

Construction
- Structure type: Underground

Other information
- Fare zone: 1 (ATM)

History
- Opened: 1906
- Rebuilt: 1952

Passengers
- 2018: 1,066,648

Services
Preceding station	FGC	Following station
La Bonanova towards Barcelona Pl. Catalunya	L6	Sarrià Terminus
La Bonanova towards Barcelona Pl. Catalunya	S1	Sarrià towards Terrassa Nacions Unides
La Bonanova towards Barcelona Pl. Catalunya	S2	Sarrià towards Sabadell Parc del Nord
Location

Les Tres Torres (Catalan pronunciation: [ləs ˈtɾɛs ˈtorəs]) is a railway station situated under the Via Augusta in the Les Tres Torres neighbourhood of Barcelona. It is served by line L6 of the Barcelona Metro and lines S1 and S2 of the Metro del Vallès commuter rail system. All these lines are operated by Ferrocarrils de la Generalitat de Catalunya, who also run the station.

The station has twin tracks and two 75 metres (246 ft) long side platforms.

The line on which Les Tres Torres is located opened in 1863, but the first station on the site did not open until 1906. The current station was opened in 1952, when the line through the station was put underground.

== See also ==
- List of Barcelona Metro stations
- List of railway stations in Barcelona
