= El Putxet i el Farró =

Neighbourhood in the district of Sarrià-Sant Gervasi, Barcelona

Coordinates: 41°24′20″N 2°8′43″E

- Neighborhood of Barcelona
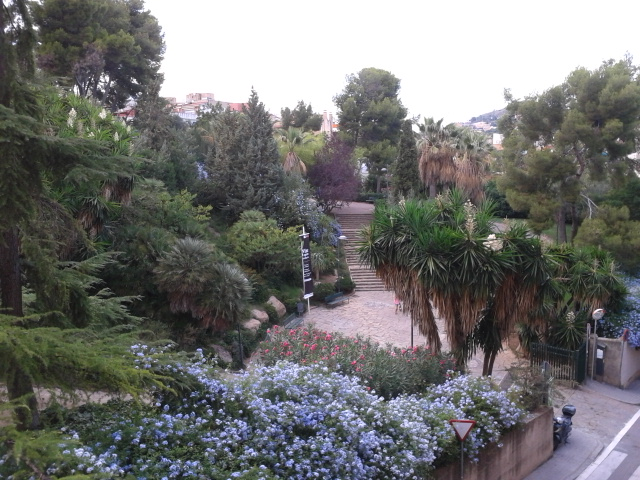
- Gardens of Putxet Hill
- Interactive map of El Putxet i el Farró
- Country: Spain
- Autonomous community: Catalonia
- Province: Barcelona
- Comarca: Barcelonès
- Municipality: Barcelona
- District: Sarrià-Sant Gervasi

Area
  - Total: 0.846 km^{2} (0.327 sq mi)

Population
  - Total: 29,318
  - Density: 34,700/km^{2} (89,800/sq mi)

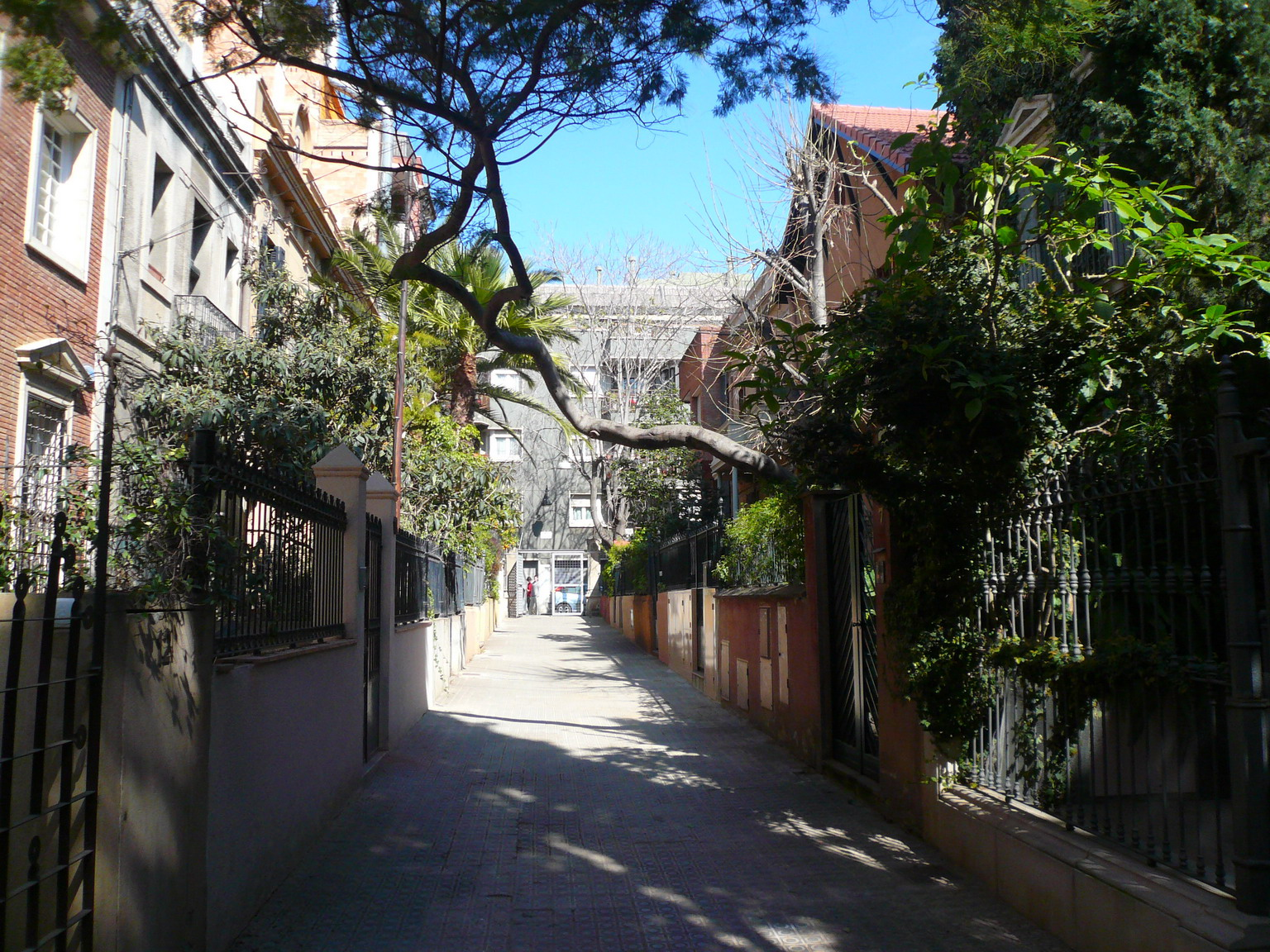
Passatge de Sant Felip

El Putxet i Farró (Catalan pronunciation: [əl puˈtʃɛt jəl fəˈro], not el Putget i el Farró) is a neighbourhood in the Sarrià-Sant Gervasi district of Barcelona, Catalonia (Spain), located on a hill between Vallcarca and Sant Gervasi, urbanised after the 1870s. It is formed by two quarters, the former neighborhoods of el Putxet and el Farró.

== El Putxet ==
The primarily residential neighborhood Putxet is named after the hill (elevation 178 m (584 ft)) on which it is located (El turó del Putxet in Catalan meaning the knoll of the hill). The uppermost part of the hill is covered by the public park 'gardens of the hill of Putxet' (Parc del Turó del Putxet in Catalan, see image). This park was inaugurated in 1970 and covers 3.97 hectares.

== El Farró ==
The residential neighbourhood of El Farró is considered by its residents to be very family friendly. Several activities are organized throughout the year in one of its squares, such as food markets, music performances and events for kids during important festivities. The atmosphere is similar to the one of a small town, thanks to its small streets and low buildings. Most of its streets have undergone a renovation in the last few years to become more adapted to pedestrians, eliminating parking spots and considerably reducing the circulating traffic.

El Farró is limited by main busy streets and two main squares (Plaça de Lesseps and Plaça Molina), thus making it an oasis in the center of a bustling area of the city. Several transportation options, restaurants and basic stores are available at a very short walking distance. Fans of modernist architecture can find "Cases Ramos" in Plaça de Lesseps, three lesser known but still very impressive modernist apartment buildings, built in 1906 by the architect Jaume Torras i Grau.

== Transport ==
- Ferrocarrils de la Generalitat de Catalunya and Barcelona Metro station Putxet, on L7.
- Barcelona Metro station Lesseps, on L3.
