= Major de Sarrià =

Street in Barcelona, Spain

Coordinates: 41.3992°N 2.1220°E

Carrer Major de Sarrià
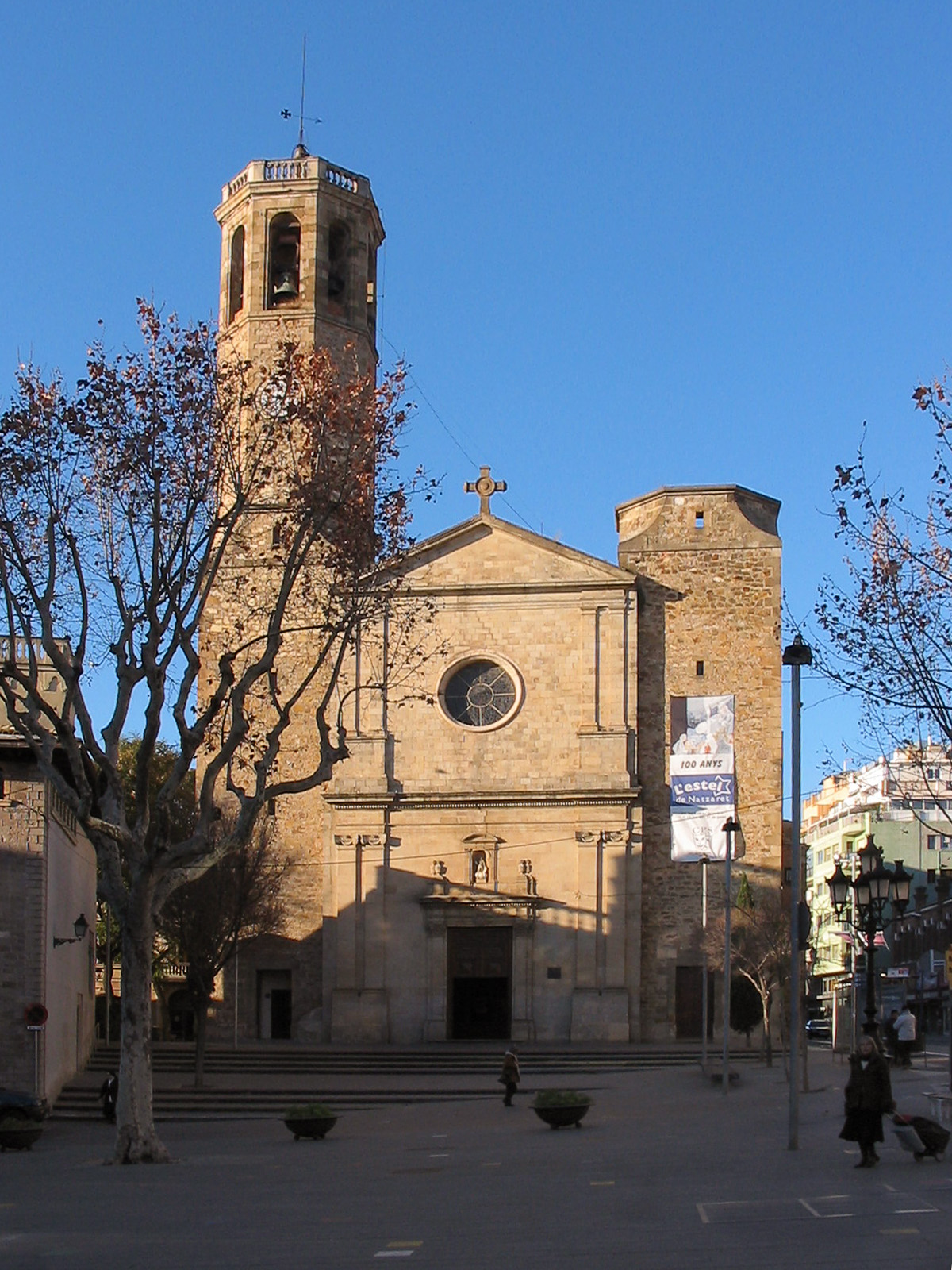
- Eglésia de Sant Vincenç de Sarrià in Plaça Sarrià
- Interactive map of Carrer Major de Sarrià
- Location: Sarrià-Sant Gervasi district, Barcelona

Major de Sarrià (Catalan: Major de Sarrià, Spanish: Mayor de Sarrià) is the main street in the Sarrià neighborhood in the Sarrià-Sant Gervasi district of Barcelona Part of the street is pedestrian-only, and that part is filled with shops and restaurants.

Bus 66 runs up the street.

== Plaça Sarrià ==
Major de Sarrià is intersected by Passeig Reina Elisenda, a busy road, and at that intersection is Plaça Sarrià, the center of Sarrià. The Reina Elisenda Metro stop is located near Plaça Sarrià, as is the Sarrià Metro and Ferrocarrils de la Generalitat de Catalunya train service stop.

The Mercat de Sarrià, a large market, is located on Plaça Sarrià, as is the Església de Sant Vicenç de Sarrià.

== Gallery ==
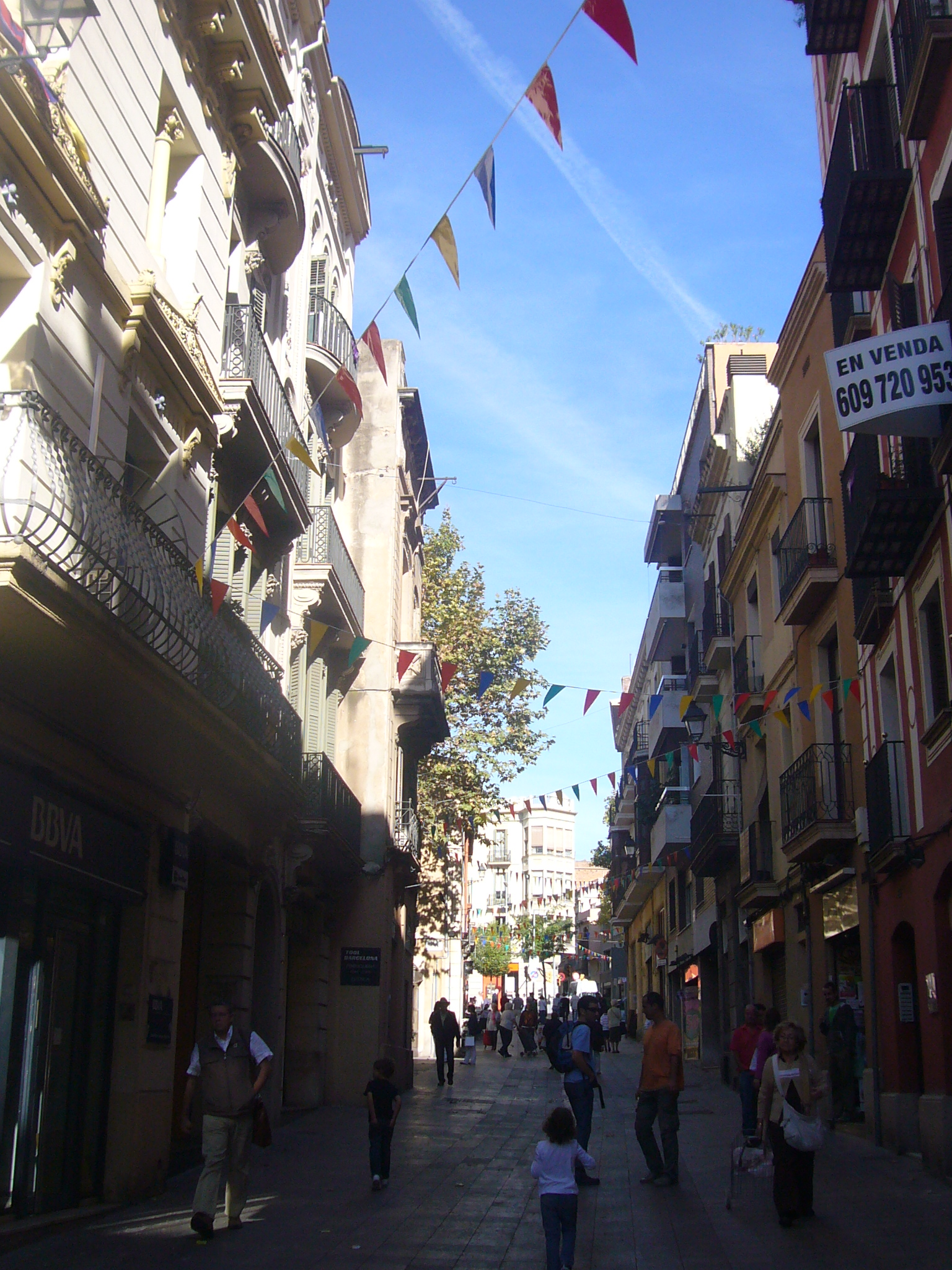

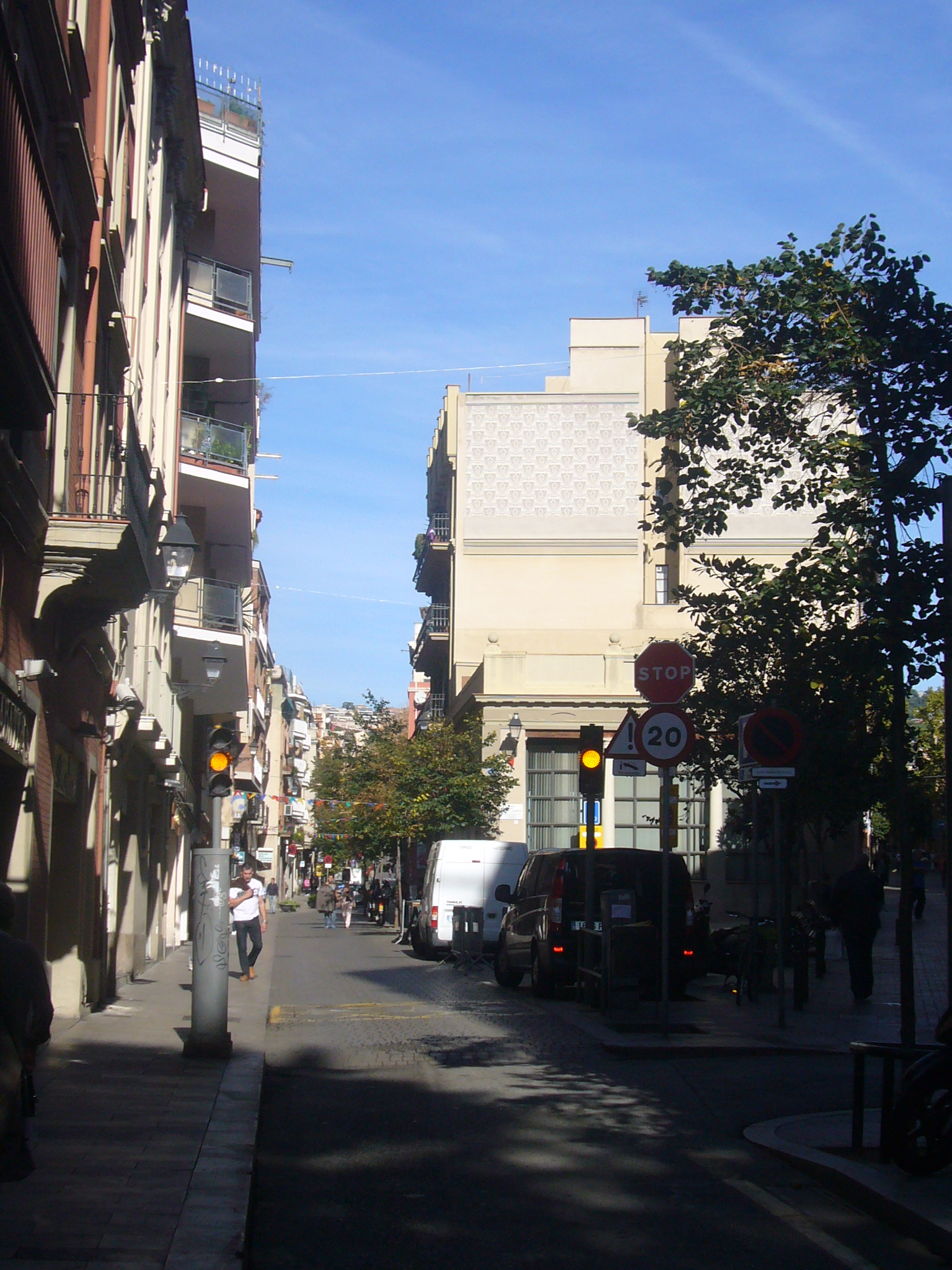

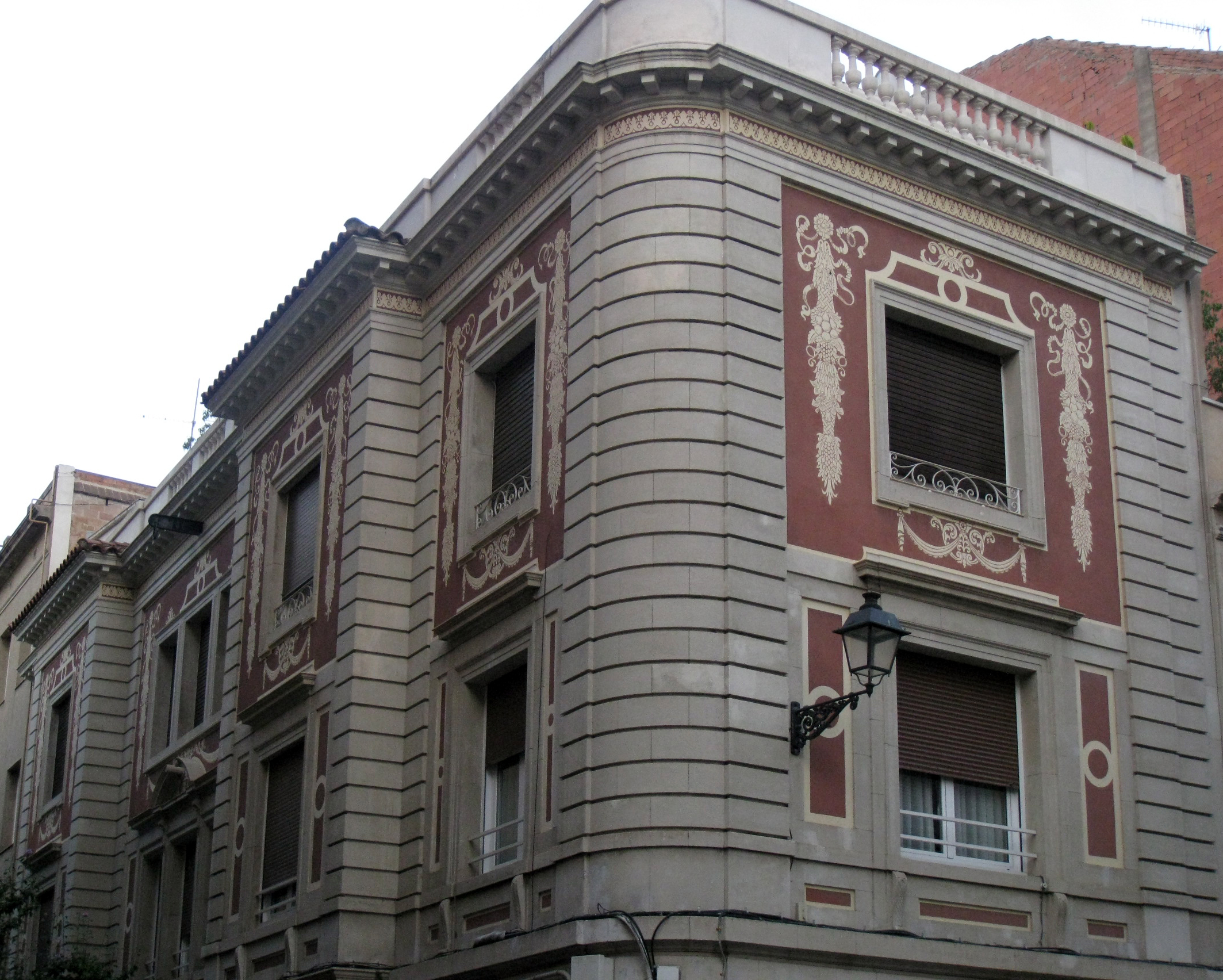
Pedró de la Creu on Major de Sarrià
