= Liceo Español Cervantes =

Spanish international school in Rome, Italy

Location
- Via Di Porta San Pancrazio, 9-10; Janiculum, Rome, 00153; Italy

Information
- School type: International school
- Established: 1973; 53 years ago
- Authority: Ministry of Education
- Language: Spanish
- Website: liceoespanolcervantes.educacion.es

Liceo Español Cervantes, named for Miguel de Cervantes, is a Spanish international school in Janiculum, Rome, Italy, operated by the Spanish Ministry of Education. It serves classes from primary school up to the bachillerato level. It is owned by the Spanish government and was established in 1973.

== See also ==
Italian international schools in Spain:

- Istituto Italiano Statale Comprensivo di Barcellona
- Scuola Statale Italiana di Madrid
