= Les Tres Torres =

Coordinates: 41°23′55″N 2°7′52″E

- Neighborhood of Barcelona
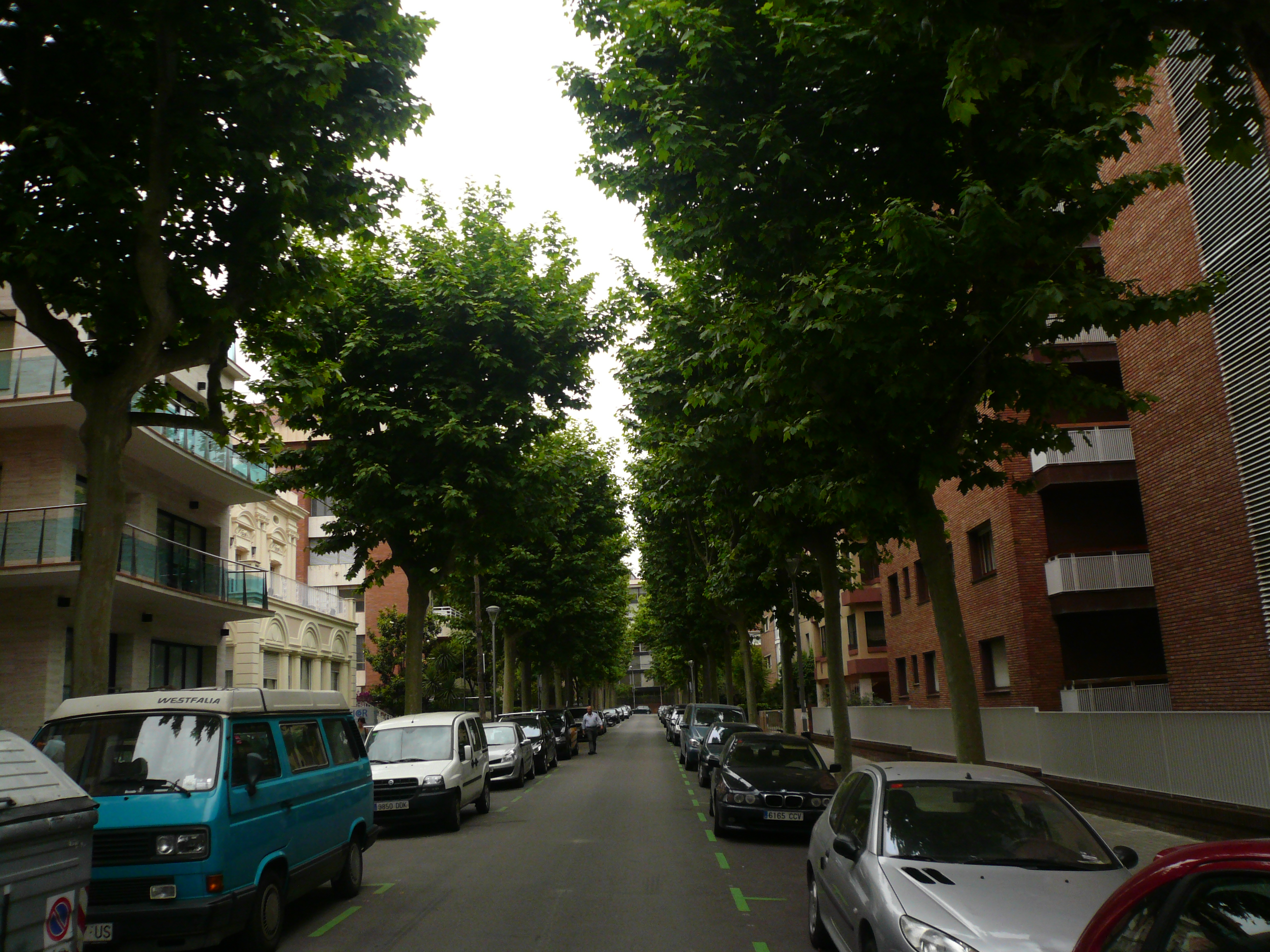
- A residential street in Les Tres Torres
- Interactive map of Les Tres Torres
- Country: Spain
- Autonomous community: Catalonia
- Province: Barcelona
- Comarca: Barcelonès
- Municipality: Barcelona
- District: Sarrià-Sant Gervasi

Area
  - Total: 0.788 km^{2} (0.304 sq mi)

Population
  - Total: 16,486
  - Density: 20,900/km^{2} (54,200/sq mi)

Les Tres Torres (Catalan pronunciation: [ləs ˈtɾɛs ˈtorəs], "the three towers") is a residential neighbourhood in the inland Sarrià-Sant Gervasi district of Barcelona, Catalonia (Spain).

== History ==
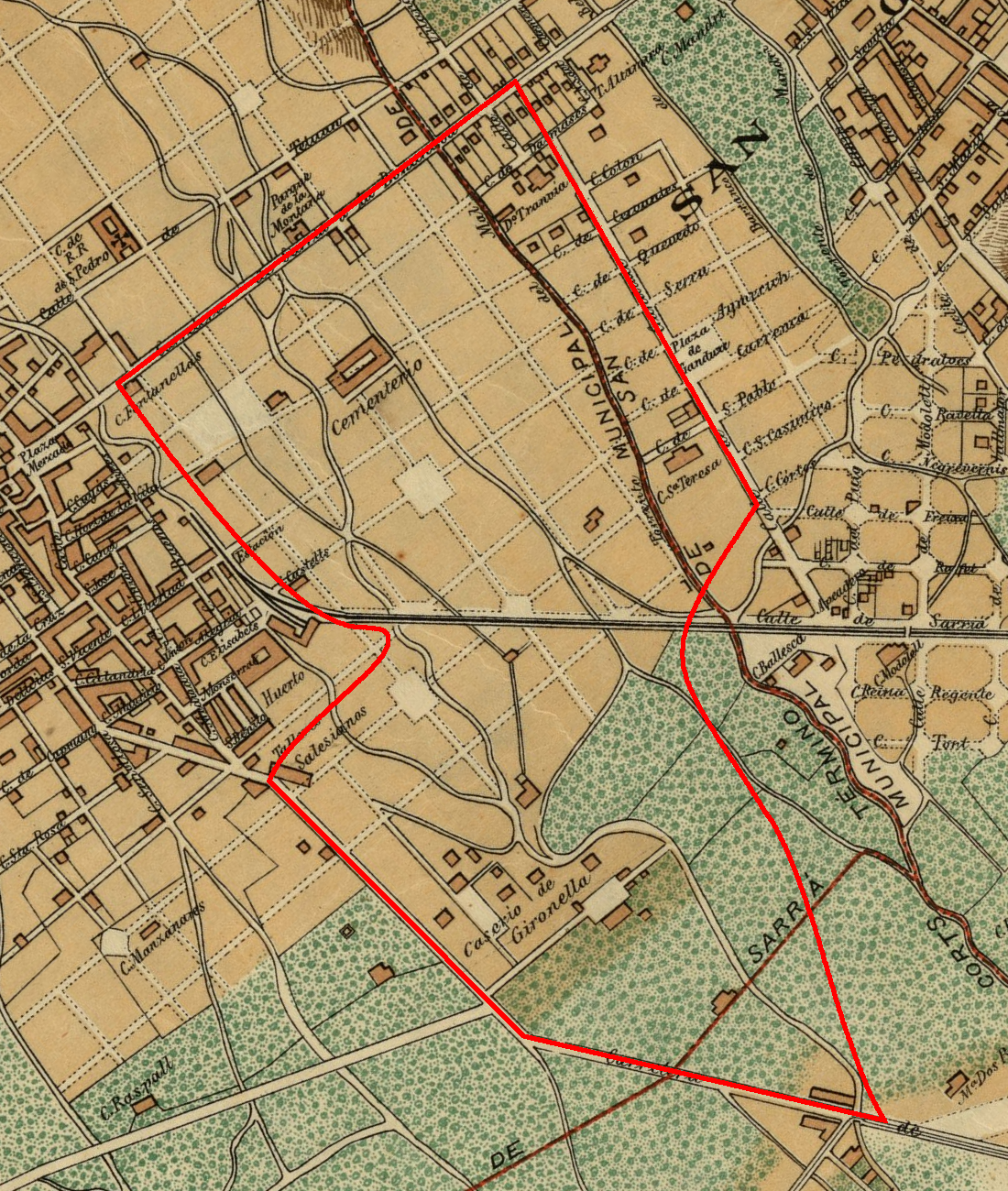
1890 map showing planned streets, with the modern boundary of Les Tres Torres

The area was originally undeveloped land between the villages of Sarrià and Sant Gervasi de Cassoles, taking in the small settlement of Gironella and the Nena Cases estate. Most of it formed the eastern part of the municipality of Sarrià, until the latter was incorporated into Barcelona in 1921. Development started with the construction between 1901 and 1903 of three grand residences (torres in Catalan) by the Mas–Romaní partnership based in Sants, of which one still stands. This set the tone (and the name) for the new neighbourhood, and further grand buildings followed.

In 1906 the Les Tres Torres station was opened on the railway line connecting Sarrià with the city, which spurred further development. The line went underground in 1952, and the Via Augusta thoroughfare now follows its course, splitting the neighbourhood in two.

Many of the early buildings have now been demolished in favour of isolated luxury apartment blocks.

The "other" Barcelona football club, RCD Espanyol, was based at Sarrià Stadium in Les Tres Torres, from 1923 until 1997, when the stadium was demolished and the lands used for housing development. The stadium hosted some matches of the 1982 FIFA World Cup and the 1992 Summer Olympics, as well as large concerts, such as Pink Floyd.

== Geography ==
Les Tres Torres covers an area of 0.8 km^{2}, and its 2013 population was 16,140, giving a density of 20,482/km^{2}.

Notable buildings include: the College of Saint Teresa-Ganduxer primary and secondary school, one of Antoni Gaudí's early works started in 1887; and Casa Muley Afid, a 1914 residential building by Josep Puig i Cadafalch which was built for Sultan Abd al-Hafid of Morocco but is now the Mexican consulate in Barcelona.

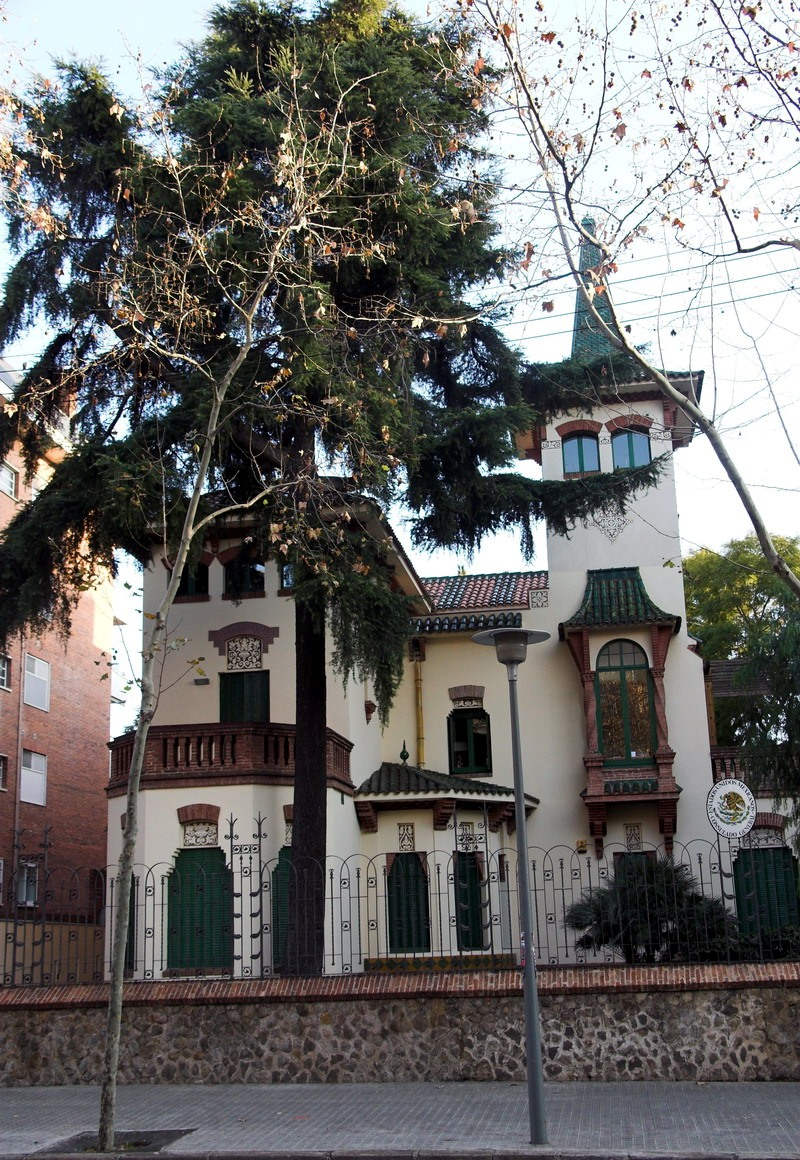
Casa Muley Afid

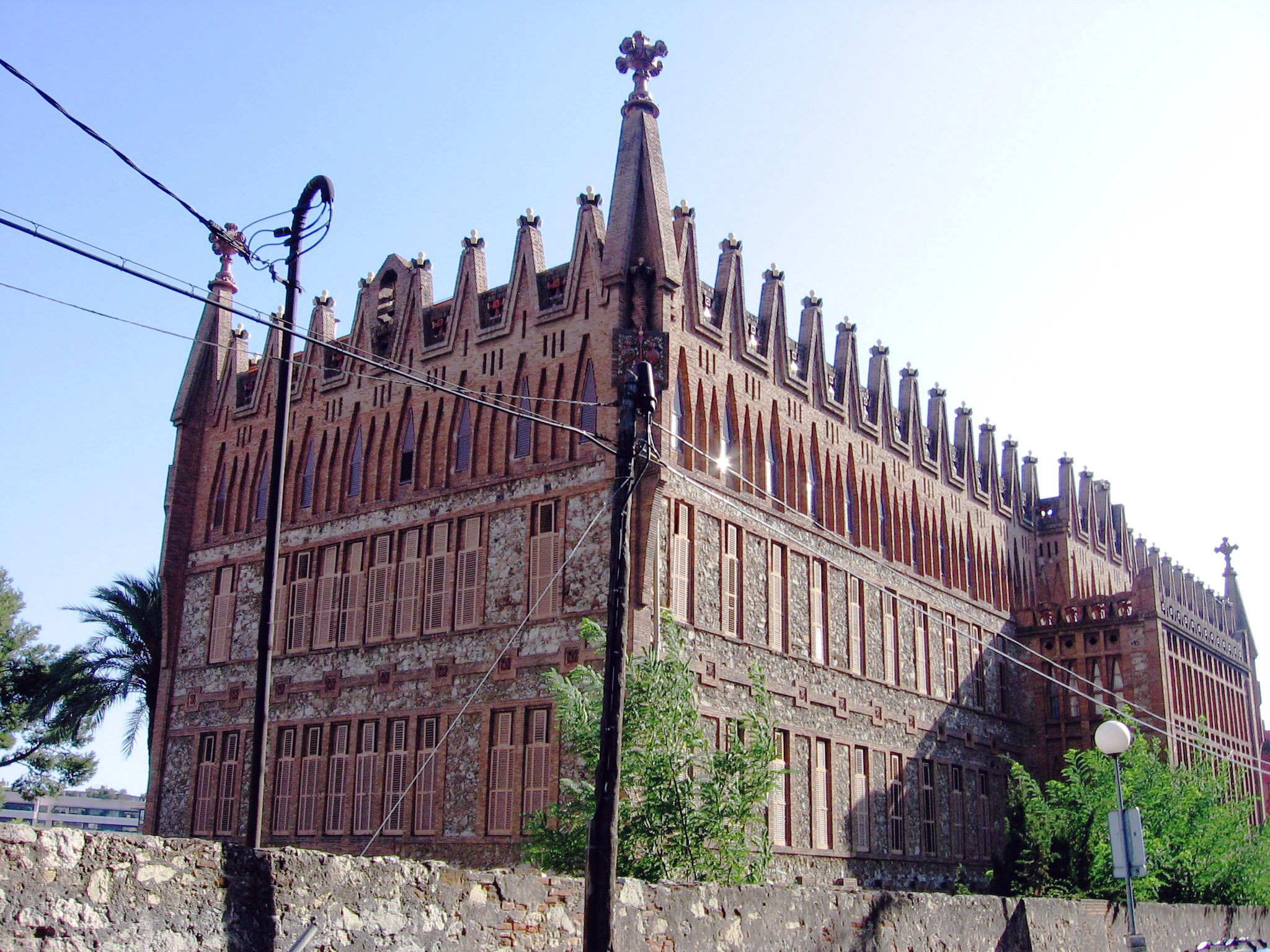
Teresian College
