= Les Corts (neighbourhood) =

Coordinates: 41°23′3″N 2°7′58″E

- Neighborhood of Barcelona
- Interactive map of Les Corts
- Country: Spain
- Autonomous community: Catalonia
- Province: Barcelona
- Comarca: Barcelonès
- Municipality: Barcelona
- District: Les Corts

Area
  - Total: 1.413 km^{2} (0.546 sq mi)

Population
  - Total: 45,976
  - Density: 32,540/km^{2} (84,270/sq mi)

Les Corts (Catalan pronunciation: [ləs ˈkorts]) is a neighborhood in the les Corts district of Barcelona, Catalonia (Spain).

It is the most central part of the district and was the main core of the old town of les Corts, or les Corts de Sarrià (added to Barcelona in 1897).
