= Sarrià-Sant Gervasi =

- District of Barcelona
- Districts of Barcelona, Sarrià-Sant Gervasi coloured red
- Interactive map of Sarrià-Sant Gervasi
- Country: Spain
- Autonomous Community: Catalonia
- Province: Barcelona
- Comarca: Barcelonès
- Municipality: Barcelona

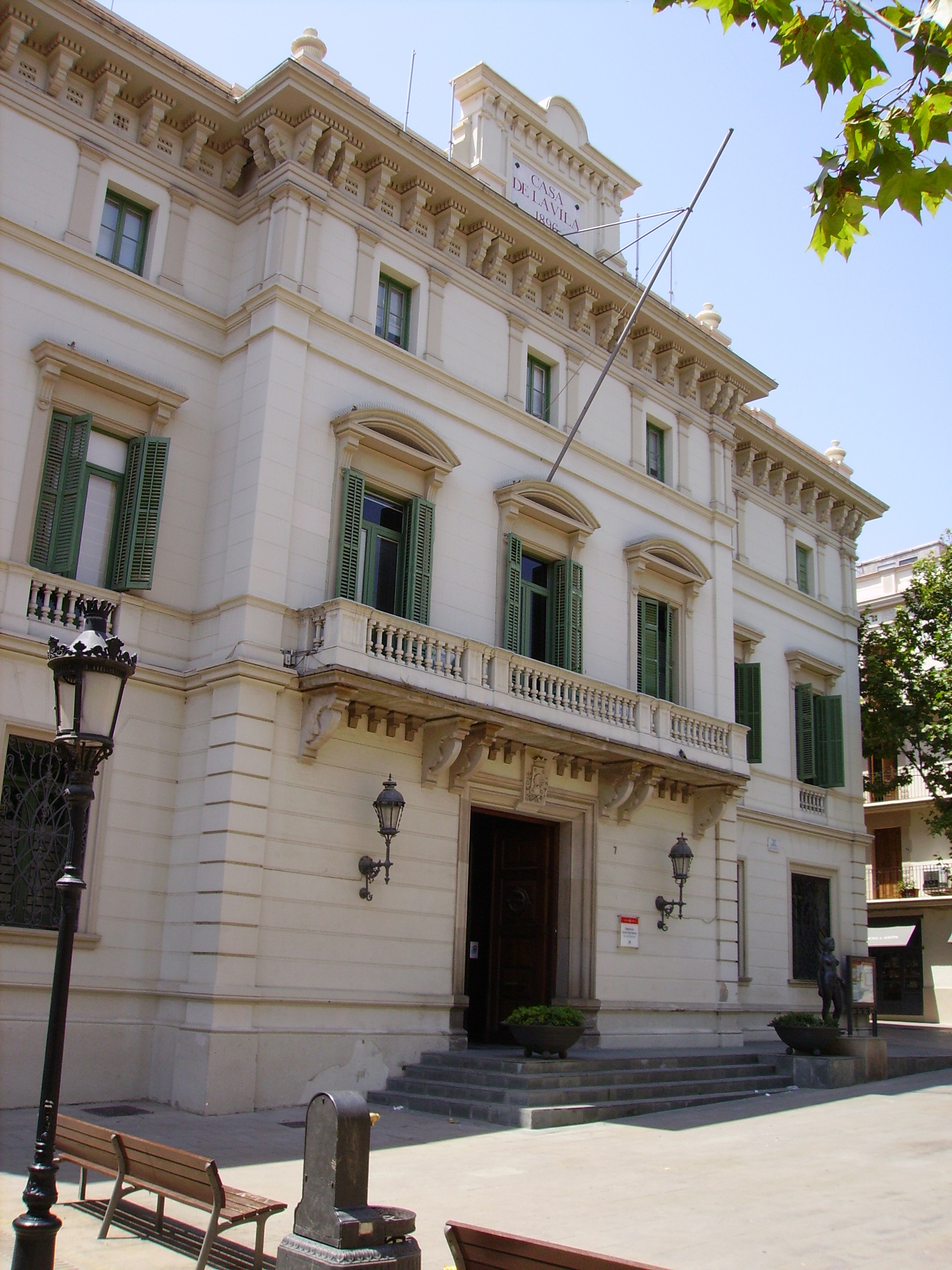
House of the District

Sarrià-Sant Gervasi (Catalan pronunciation: [səriˈa ˌsaɲ ʒərˈbazi]) is one of the biggest districts of Barcelona, Catalonia, Spain. It is the district with the highest per capita income, the largest proportion of university degrees and the lowest unemployment rate. Situated in the north-west of the city, bordered by the districts of Les Corts, Gràcia, Eixample and Horta-Guinardó and by the villages of Sant Just, Sant Feliu, Molins de Rei, and Sant Cugat. It is formed by the old villages of Sarrià (added to Barcelona in 1927), Vallvidrera (added to Sarrià in 1890), Santa Creu d'Olorda (added to Sarrià in 1916), and Sant Gervasi de Cassoles (added to Barcelona in 1897). The first written document found about Sarrià dates from the year 987, and the origins of the village are a Roman colony. The old Monestir de Pedralbes belonged to the village of Sarrià, and it is now the Thyssen-Bornemisza Museum.

Today, Sarrià still retains a village atmosphere, even in the middle of Barcelona, with narrow streets and small houses. The main street of Sarrià is Major de Sarrià.

The main market in Sarrià-Sant Gervasi is the Mercat de Sarrià on Passeig Reina Elisenda, which opened in 1900 and was renovated in 1967 and again in 2007.

Part of the Collserola mountain belongs to the district, where the Tibidabo and the Observatori Fabra are, and it is a popular place to promenade by bike or by foot or to stop by the road to Sant Cugat, with impressive views over the city.

== Neighbourhoods ==
It is divided into these neighbourhoods (some of them include traditional or non-administrative neighbourhoods):

- El Putxet i Farró
- Sarrià
- Sant Gervasi - la Bonanova
- Sant Gervasi - Galvany
- Les Tres Torres
- Vallvidrera, Tibidabo i les Planes

== Education ==
The preschool through lower secondary campus of Istituto Italiano Statale Comprensivo di Barcellona, an Italian international school, is located at Carrer de Setantí, 10–12 in Sarrià.

The Lycée Français de Barcelone, a French international school founded in 1924 and operated by the Agency for French Education Abroad, is also located in the neighbourhood, at Carrer de Bosch i Gimpera, 6–10.

La Salle Campus Barcelona, a university center affiliated with Ramon Llull University since 1991, is situated at Carrer de Sant Joan de la Salle, 42 in the neighbourhood. The campus offers programmes in engineering, architecture, business, digital arts, and health engineering.

== Notable people ==
Porta (rapper)

== See also ==
- Districts of Barcelona
- Street names in Barcelona
- Urban planning of Barcelona
