= Scuola Statale Italiana di Madrid =

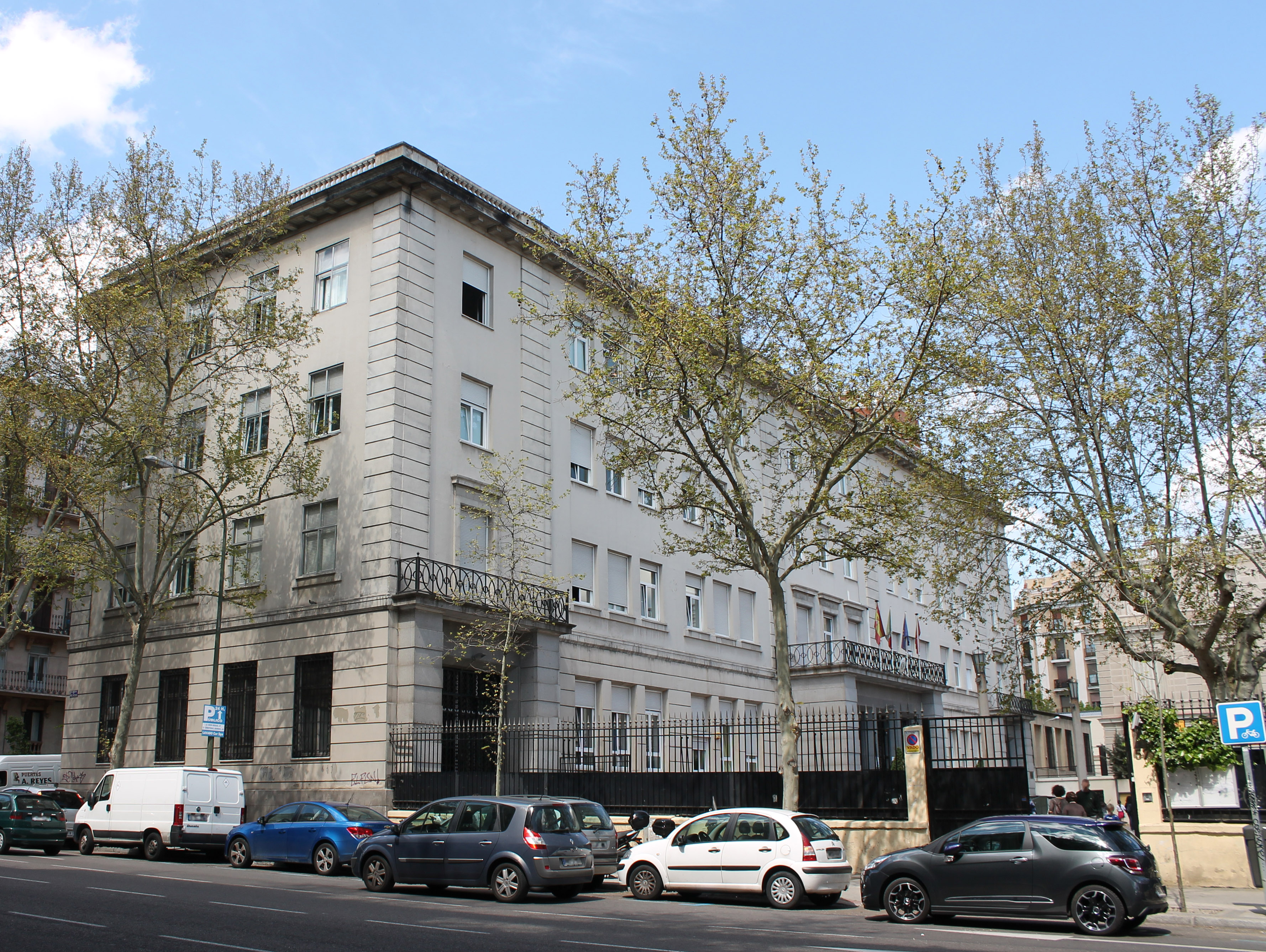

Location
- C/ Agustín de Bethencourt, 1 28003 Madrid
- Coordinates: 40.4421°N 3.6957°W

Information
- Website: scuolamadrid.org www.scuolamaternaitalianamadrid.com

Scuola Statale Italiana di Madrid or the Istituto Italiano Statale Comprensivo "Enrico Fermi" is an Italian international school in Madrid, Spain. Owned by the Italian government, it has scuola dell'infanzia, scuola primaria, scuola media, and liceo levels.
