= Istituto Italiano Statale Comprensivo di Barcellona =

Italiano Statale Comprensivo di Barcellona

Location
- Head office/Secondary: C/ de l'Esperança, 20; Primary (Sarrià): C/. Setantí, 10-12 (Sarrià)
- Coordinates: 41.40391°N 2.12673°E

Information
- Website: www.scuolaitalianabarcellona.com

Istituto Italiano Statale Comprensivo di Barcellona or the Istituto Italiano Statale Comprensivo "Edoardo Amaldi" is an Italian international school in Barcelona, Catalonia, Spain. Owned by the Italian government, it consists of three parts: Scuole secondarie "Edoardo Amaldi", Scuola primaria "Maria Montessori" and scuola dell'infanzia riconosciuta "Maria Montessori". The school administration and liceo (senior high school/sixth form college) occupy one campus, while all other classes are in a Sarrià facility.

Campuses

== See also ==
Spanish international schools in Italy:

- Liceo Español Cervantes
