= Vallvidrera =

Coordinates: 41°24′54″N 2°06′31″E

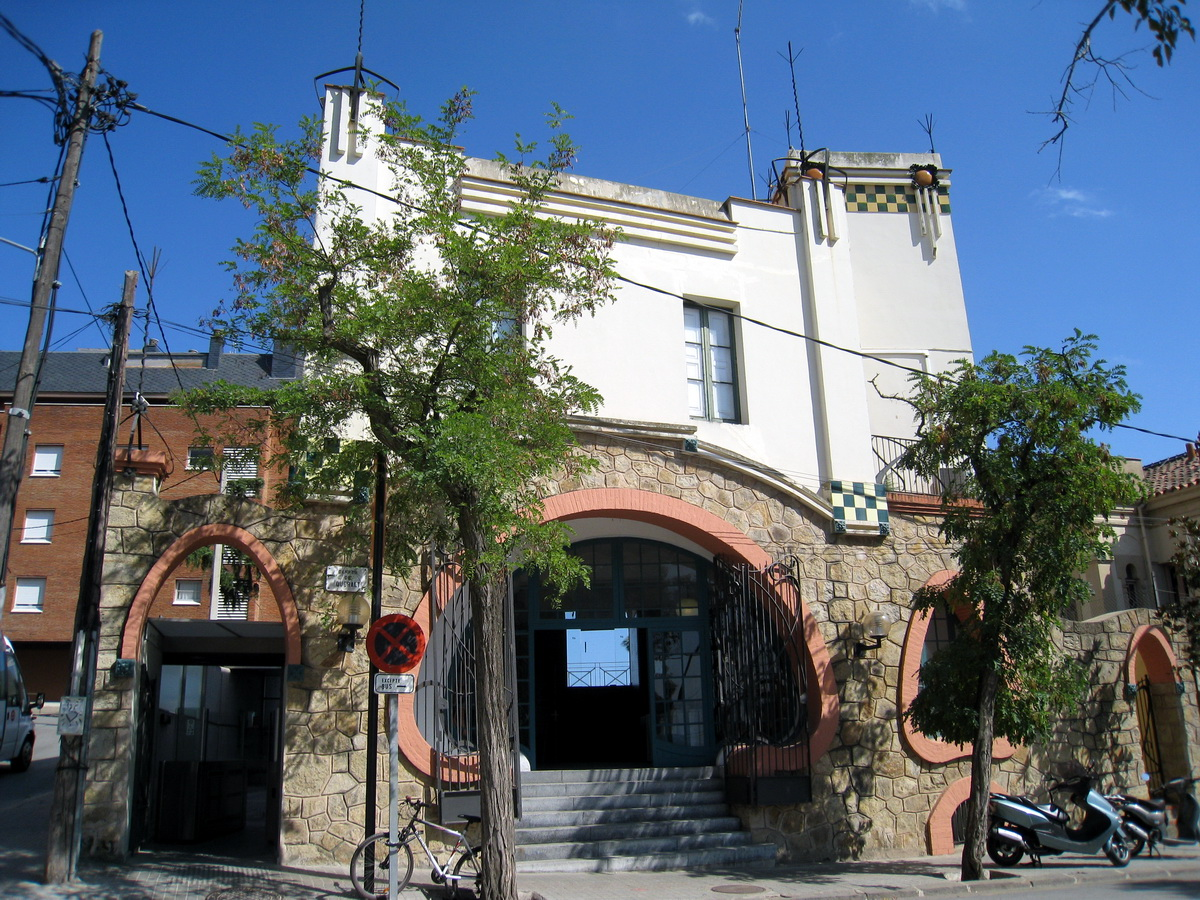
Vallvidrera-Superior, the top station of the Vallvidriera funicular, was constructed in 1905 by the architects Bonaventura Conill i Montobbio and Arnald Calvet i Peyronill.

Vallvidrera (Catalan pronunciation: [ˌbaʎβiˈðɾeɾə]) is a neighbourhood of the Sarrià-Sant Gervasi district of Barcelona, Spain. It is situated in one of the sides of the Collserola hills, considered to be the lungs of the city due to the abundant forests it has. This wealthy neighbourhood has excellent views of the whole city, from some specific places and on a clear day it is possible to see Mallorca and the Pyrenees on the horizon. Despite being a residential place it has important things such as, the Torre de Collserola (a communications tower designed by the architect Norman Foster), the Tibidabo Amusement Park and the Temple Expiatori del Sagrat Cor.

Vallvidrera used to be a cool summer retreat where wealthy people from Barcelona had their summer houses. Now the wealthy live in this neighbourhood all year round and have their summer retreats in further places inside Catalonia, such as the Costa Brava (for summer vacations) or Puigcerda (for winter vacations).

Vallvidrera can be reached by the Funicular de Vallvidrera, which connects at its lower station with the Metro del Vallès suburban railway with frequent services to the city center. The neighborhood is also served by minibus line 111, which connects to the upper station of the Vallvidrera funicular and the top of the Tibidabo hill. Other than the Funicular and the Bus, the most common type of transportation is the private one.
