= Lycée Français de Barcelone =

Lycée français de Barcelone
- Liceo Francés de Barcelona; Liceu francès de Barcelona
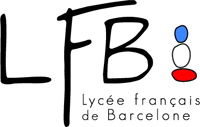

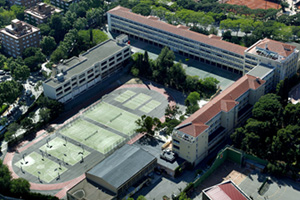

Location
- Carrer de Bosch i Gimpera, 6 Barcelona, 08034; Spain; 41.3926°N 2.1187°E

Information
- Established: 1924
- Principal: Dominique Duthel
- Headmaster: Olivier Rubiera, Emily Vermersch
- Years: Kindergarten to sixth-form
  - Grade 13: 219 (2016/17)
- Student Union/Association: Conseil de la vie lycéenne
- Colors: Red, white, blue
- School fees: from €4,659 (kindergarten) to €5,712 (Terminale)
- Website: www.lfb.es

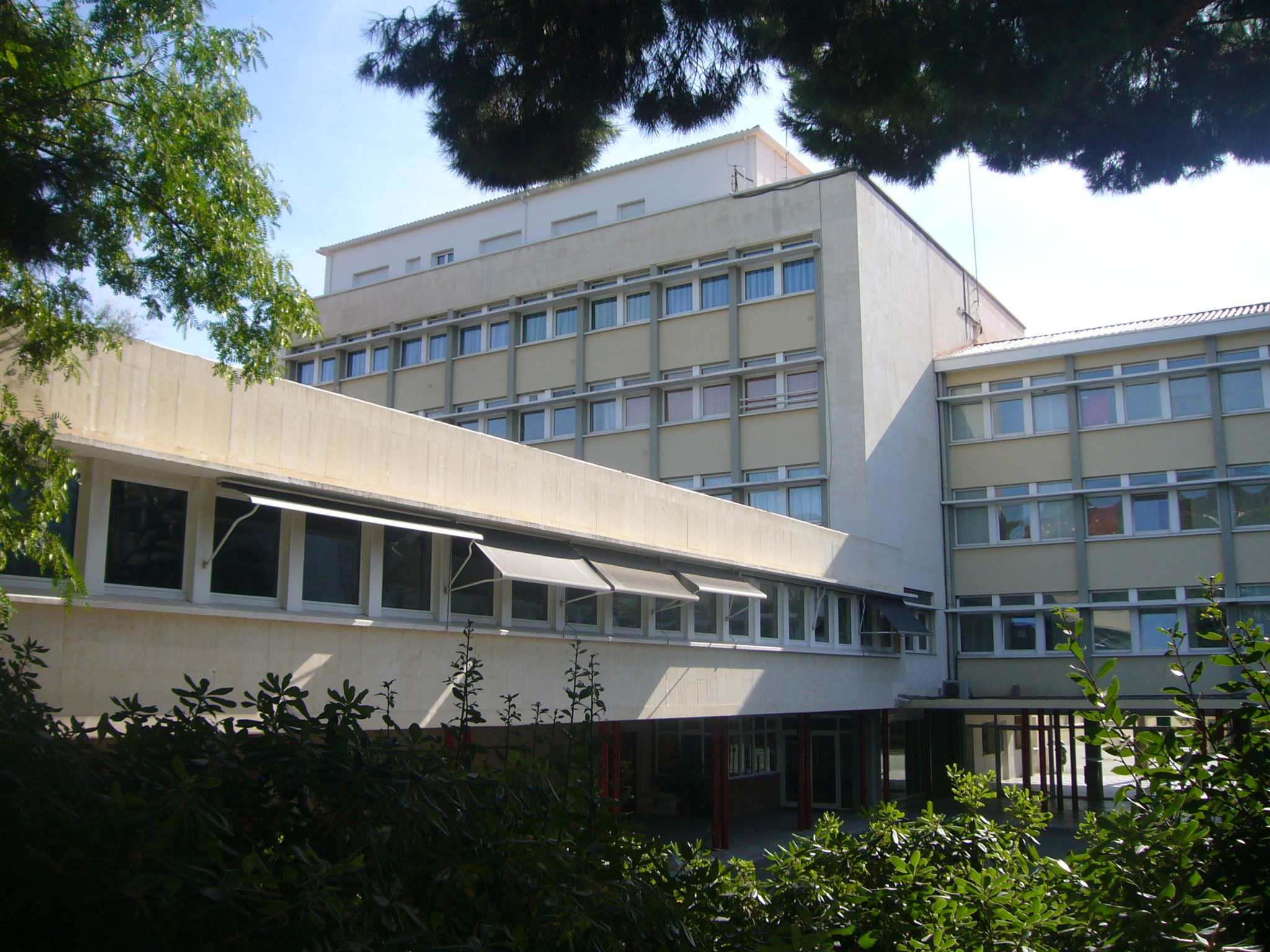
Lycée Français de Barcelone

The Lycée français de Barcelone (LFB; Spanish: Liceo Francés de Barcelona, Catalan: Liceu francès de Barcelona) is a French international school in Barcelona, Catalonia, Spain. The school was founded in 1924, and is directly operated by the Agency for French Education Abroad (AEFE), an agency of the French government. It has classes from maternelle (preschool) to lycée (senior high school).

The main campus is in Pedralbes, while the maternelle (preschool) campus is in Bonanova.

== History ==
From 2000 to 2010 the school tuition rose by 57%. In 2010 about 500 families protested the rise in tuition by not paying the second trimester's enrollment.

As of 2013 the school does not translate notices and information into Catalan. In response to parents who asked for Catalan translations, the school argued that Catalan families understand Castilian Spanish well, making it unnecessary to translate things into Catalan. However, as of 2024, notices have been translated into Catalan.

== Student body ==
As of 2010 there were 2,816 students, with 2,359 at the main campus and 457 at the maternelle campus.

As of 2010 the students come from 1,800 families. 1,000 families paid tuition, while 800 were on scholarships for 100% of their tuition. The latter were families of employees of French multinational companies, diplomats, teachers, and administrators.

== Notable alumni ==
The children of the Urdangarín-Borbón marriage of the Spanish royal family attended this school.

== See also ==
- Institut français de Barcelone (Institut Francès de Barcelona)
- Liceo Español Luis Buñuel, a Spanish international school near Paris, France
