= Les Corts (district) =

- District
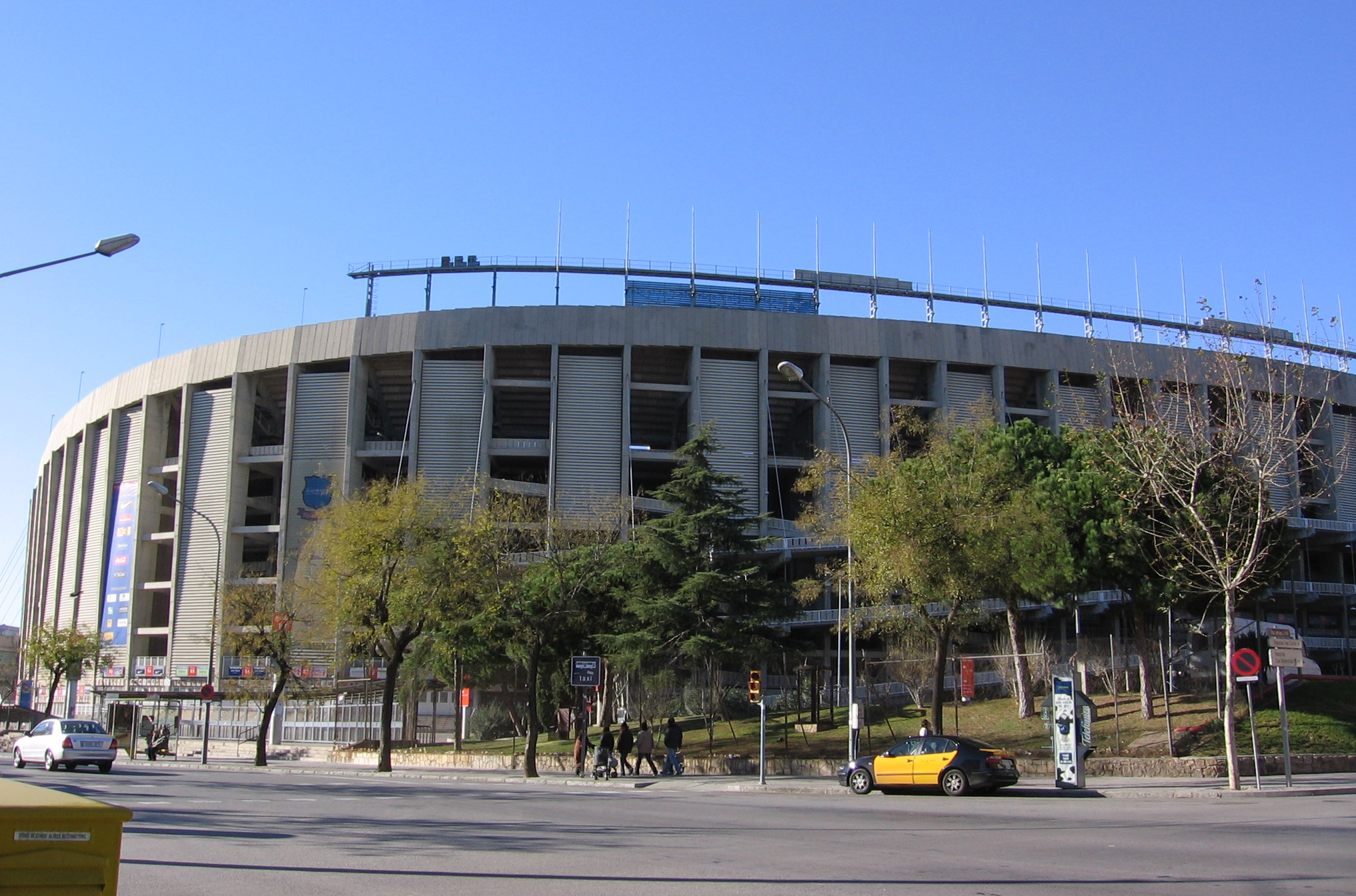
- Camp Nou in Les Corts

- Location in Barcelona
- Coordinates: 41°23′14″N 02°08′30″E
- Country: Spain
- Autonomous community: Catalonia
- Province: Barcelona
- Comarque: Barcelonès
- City: Barcelona
- Established: 1897

Area
  - Total: 6.02 km^{2} (2.32 sq mi)

Population (2021)
  - Total: 81,577
  - Density: 13,600/km^{2} (35,100/sq mi)

Languages
  - Official: Catalan and Spanish
- PIN: 080xx
- Telephone code: +34

Les Corts (Catalan pronunciation: [ləs ˈkoɾts]) is one of the ten districts of the city of Barcelona in the Spanish autonomous community of Catalonia. It was a free territory tied to the crown, and became the autonomous municipality of Les Corts de Sarrià in 1836. In 1897, it was added to Barcelona, and was marked as district number four in the current demarcation in 1984.

Extending over a land area of 6.02 km^{2} (2.32 sq mi), it is the third smallest district in Barcelona after Ciutat Vella and Gràcia. It is located in the western part of the city, bordered by the districts of Sarrià-Sant Gervasi, Eixample, and Sants-Montjuïc, and the municipalities of L'Hospitalet de Llobregat and Esplugues de Llobregat in the Metropolitan Area of Barcelona. It had a population of 81,577 inhabitants in 2021, making it the least populous district of the city.

== Etymology ==
The name is derived from Latin word cohors or cohortes (meaning "rural houses"), as a reference to the local Roman villas and masies which stood there before the urbanisation of the area in the late 20th century.

== History ==
The origin of the earliest settlements at the site have been dated to earlier than 5th century BCE. The urban area was founded by Phoenician settlers, who established trading posts along the Catalonian coast. It was under Roman occupation since the 1st century BCE. The Visigoths took over the area in early 5th century CE, before the Umayyads took it in 8th century CE, and was later conquered by Carolingians, who made it a buffer zone ruled by the Counts of Barcelona. In 1137 CE, the Aragon and the Counts merged to form the Crown of Aragon. The region became an important economic center in the later Middle Ages.

Les Corts was a free territory directly tied to the crown, and became the autonomous municipality of Les Corts de Sarrià in 1836. It became part of the Kingdom of Spain in the late 19th century CE and was incorporated into the city of Barcelona in 1897. It was part of the short lived Republic of Spain in the 20th century, before finally becoming part of modern day Spain.

== Geography ==
Les Corts is one of the ten districts of the city of Barcelona in the Spanish autonomous community of Catalonia. It has been marked as district number four since the current demarcation in 1984. Extending over a land area of 6.02 km^{2} (2.32 sq mi), it is the third smallest district in Barcelona after Ciutat Vella and Gràcia. It is located in the western part of the city, bordered by the districts of Sarrià-Sant Gervasi, Eixample, and Sants-Montjuïc, and the municipalities of L'Hospitalet de Llobregat and Esplugues de Llobregat in the Metropolitan Area of Barcelona. It had a population of 81,577 inhabitants in 2021, making it the least populous district of the city.

The region had farmlands till the 19th century and developed into an urbanized area later. As a result, there are many parks and gardens that have been maintained as a part of keeping the green cover. The center of the region is made up of the squares of Can Rosés, de la Concordia, and de Comas, located on a central strip between Travessera de les Corts and Carrer de Deu i Mata. The Camp de Les Corts was a major football stadium in the region during the early 20th century. Following the construction of Camp Nou, it was converted into a public park. Camp Nou is amongst the football stadiums with the largest capacity in Europe.

== Sub-divisions ==
In 2006, the area was further divided into three neighbourhoods–Les Corts, Pedralbes, and La Maternitat i Sant Ramon.

Neighbourhoods
Name	Population	Size (ha)
Les Corts	45,943	141
La Maternitat i Sant Ramon	23,825	191.5
Pedralbes	11,808	268.5
Total	81,577	602

== See also ==
- Avinguda de Josep Tarradellas, Barcelona
- Street names in Barcelona
- Urban planning of Barcelona
