= Sant Gervasi – la Bonanova =

Coordinates: 41°24′23″N 2°8′1″E

Sant Gervasi - la Bonanova
- Neighborhood of Barcelona
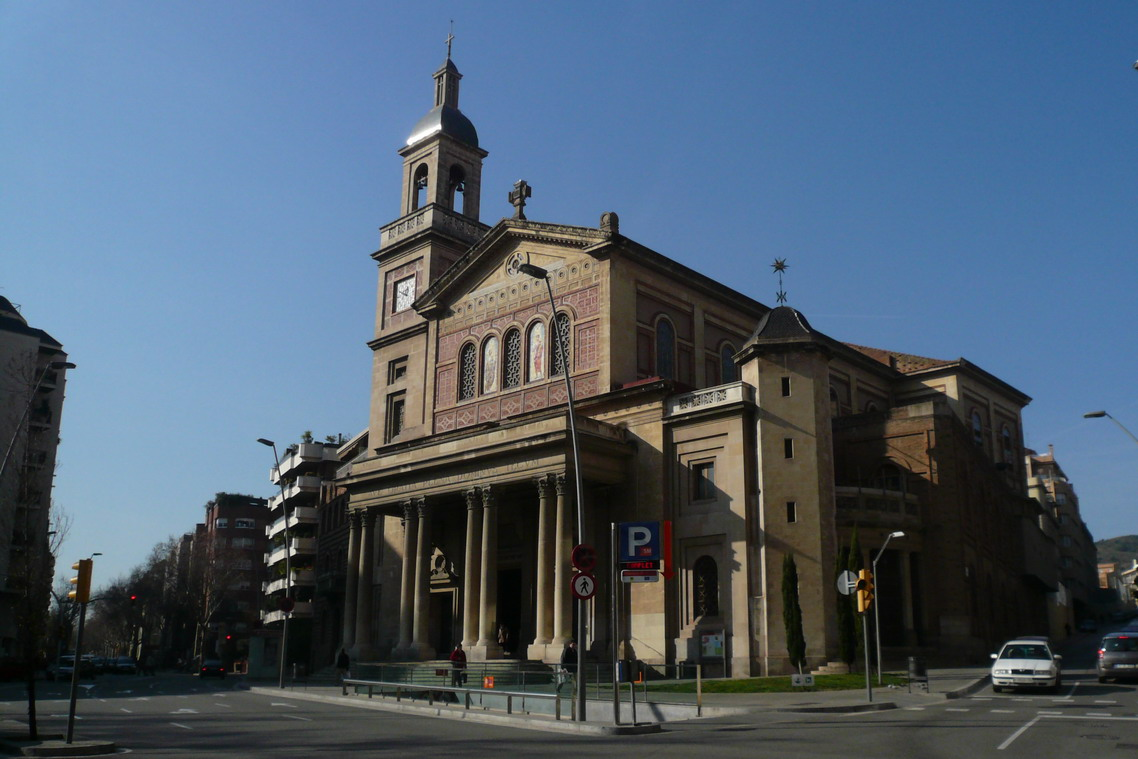
- La Bonanova church
- Interactive map of Sant Gervasi - la Bonanova
- Country: Spain
- Autonomous community: Catalonia
- Province: Barcelona
- Comarca: Barcelonès
- Municipality: Barcelona
- District: Sarrià-Sant Gervasi

Area
  - Total: 2.235 km^{2} (0.863 sq mi)

Population
  - Total: 25,761
  - Density: 11,530/km^{2} (29,850/sq mi)

Sant Gervasi – la Bonanova (Catalan pronunciation: [ˌsaɲ ʒərˈbazi lə ˌβɔnəˈnɔβə]) is a neighbourhood in the Sarrià-Sant Gervasi district of Barcelona, Catalonia (Spain). Formerly it was with the neighbourhood of Sant Gervasi - Galvany, an independent municipality called Sant Gervasi de Cassoles.

The neighbourhood is divided mainly into two distinct sectors: the area of Sant Gervasi, where it houses the oldest nucleus of the town of Sant Gervasi de Cassoles, and another sector, that of la Bonanova, born when it was built the road connecting Sarrià with Sant Gervasi.

The maternelle (preschool) campus of the Lycée Français de Barcelone, the French international school of Barcelona, is in Bonanova.
