= Pedralbes =

Coordinates: 41°23′41″N 2°6′47″E

- Neighborhood of Barcelona
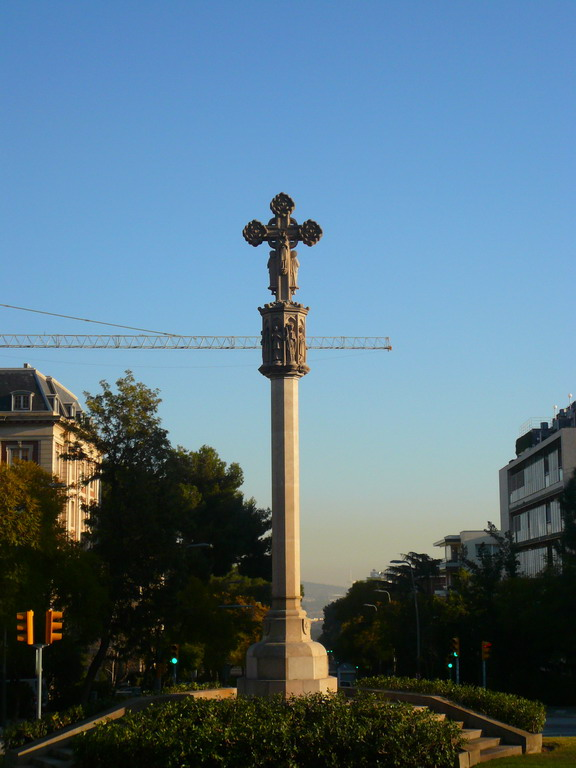
- Creu de Pedralbes on Pedralbes avenue
- Interactive map of Pedralbes
- Country: Spain
- Autonomous community: Catalonia
- Province: Barcelona
- Comarca: Barcelonès
- Municipality: Barcelona
- District: Les Corts

Area
  - Total: 2.702 km^{2} (1.043 sq mi)

Population
  - Total: 11,864
  - Density: 4,391/km^{2} (11,370/sq mi)
- Demonym(s): pedralbenc, -a

Pedralbes (Catalan pronunciation: [pəˈðɾalβəs], Old Catalan for white stones, Spanish pronunciation: [peˈðɾalβes]) is a neighborhood in Les Corts district of Barcelona, Catalonia (Spain). Before the administrative division of 1984, the neighborhood was part of Sarrià and the former municipality of Sant Vicenç de Sarrià.

Pedralbes was the home of the Infanta Cristina of Spain from 2004 to 2013.

The Lycée Français de Barcelone, a French international school, is located in Pedralbes.

Pedralbes was completely transformed beginning in the 1940s with the urbanisation of the area. Pedralbes is today Barcelona's most upmarket residential area, with large mansions surrounded by gardens, around Avinguda de Pearson, or isolated luxury apartment blocks, around Avinguda de Pedralbes.
