= Sant Gervasi – Galvany =

Coordinates: 41°23′48″N 2°8′38″E

Sant Gervasi - Galvany
- Neighborhood of Barcelona
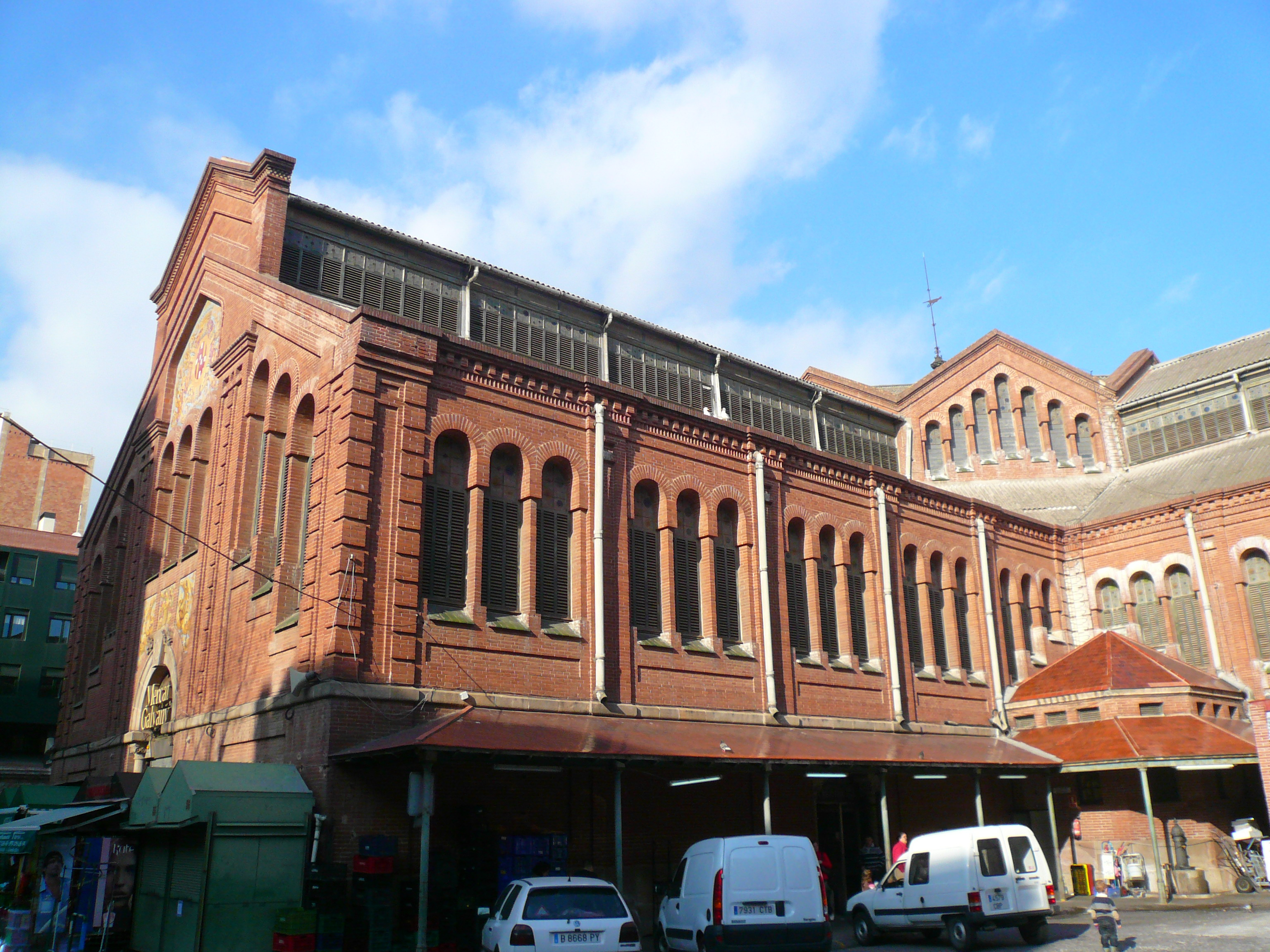
- Mercat de Galvany
- Interactive map of Sant Gervasi - Galvany
- Country: Spain
- Autonomous community: Catalonia
- Province: Barcelona
- Comarca: Barcelonès
- Municipality: Barcelona
- District: Sarrià-Sant Gervasi

Area
  - Total: 1.659 km^{2} (0.641 sq mi)

Population
  - Total: 47,156
  - Density: 28,420/km^{2} (73,620/sq mi)

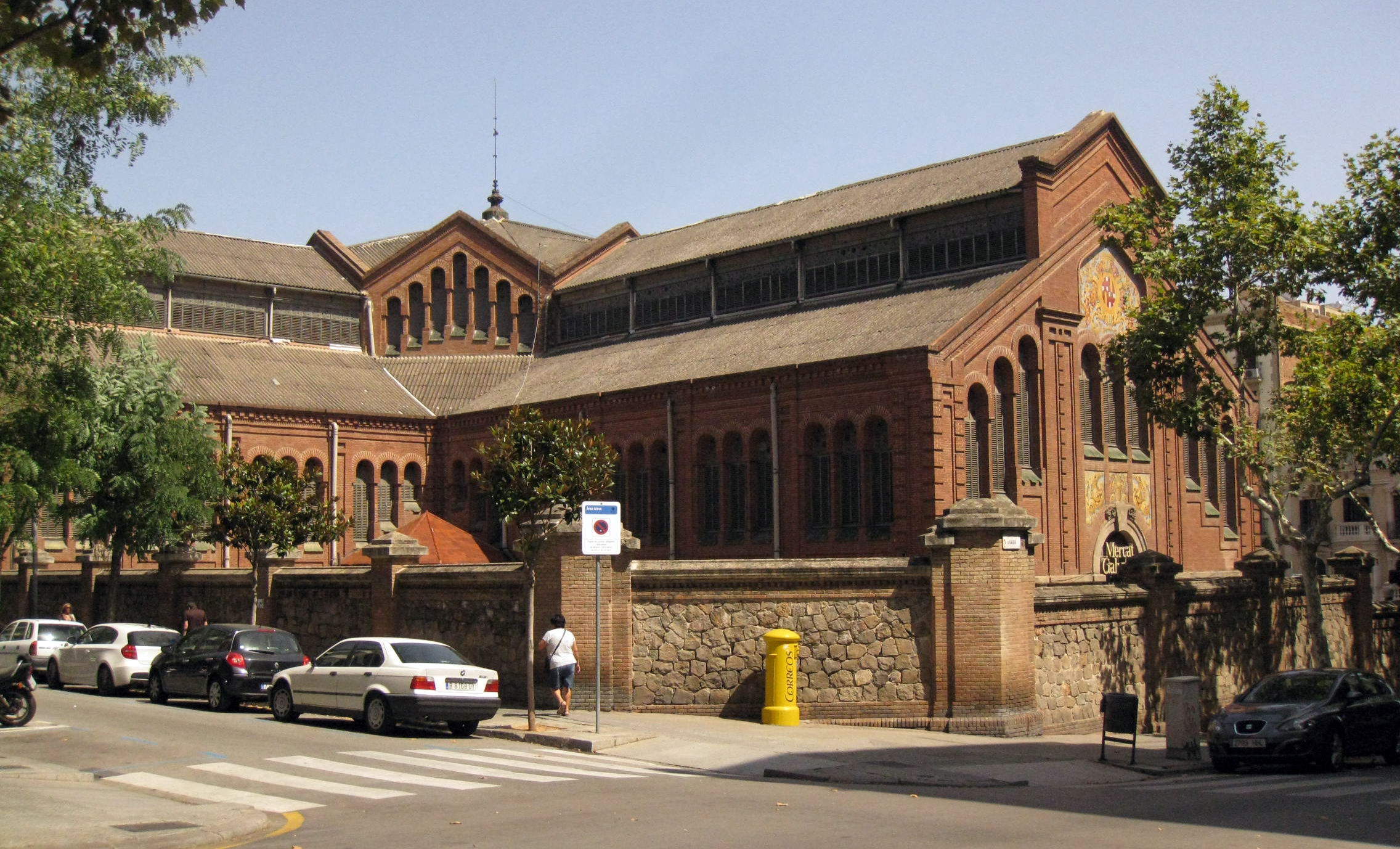
Galvany market

Sant Gervasi – Galvany (Catalan pronunciation: [ˌsaɲ ʒərˈbazi ɣəlˈβaɲ]) is a neighborhood in the Sarrià-Sant Gervasi district of Barcelona, Catalonia (Spain). The name of the neighborhood refers to Sant Gervasi de Cassoles, which was one of the parts of the former municipality of Sant Gervasi de Cassoles; and the Camp d'en Galvany urbanization which was begun in 1866 by its owner, Joseph Galvany Castelló. The Galvany name became popular when the market Galvany was built, located between the neighborhood streets Santaló, Calaf, Amigó and Madrazo, and the market has a plaque on the facade of Santaló street recalling that Josep Galvany Castelló gave the land on which the market was built to the municipality.

It occupies the area between Av. Diagonal, Av. de Sarrià, General Mitre, Balmes and Via Augusta. This area corresponds approximately to the neighbourhood of Lledó which took its name from the old Mas Lledó in the division of neighbourhoods approved by the Sant Gervasi town hall in 1879.

The population of the neighborhood are mainly of upper class extraction and the oldest part is around the streets of Sagués i Amigó. From the 1950s onwards numerous new buildings have been constructed, the most luxurious of which are to be found in Muntaner street.

Today it is a neighborhood with a lively nightlife due to the large number of bars, restaurants and nightspots, especially around Santaló and the surrounding streets.

The nearby Turó Park is covered in a separate article in the Spanish Wikipedia.
