= Metro Disco =

Former gay nightclub at Carrer de Sepúlveda 185

Metro
- Address: Carrer de Sepúlveda, 185
- Location: Gaixample, Eixample, Barcelona, Spain
- Type: LGBTQ historic venue

Construction
- Opened: 1989
- Closed: April 2021

Metro, also known as Metro Disco or Sala Metro, was a gay nightclub at Carrer de Sepúlveda 185 in the Eixample district of Barcelona, Spain. Opened in 1989, it was one of the first venues of what became known as the Gaixample, the city's LGBT nightlife area. Open every night and regarded as one of the best-known gay clubs in the city, it operated for over three decades until it closed permanently in 2021.

== Background ==
Until the 1980s, most of Barcelona's gay bars were in Ciutat Vella. With the end of Francoism and the repeal of the laws that persecuted homosexuality, the first gay bars opened in the Esquerra de l'Eixample in the early 1980s, shifting the centre of gay and lesbian nightlife away from the Raval and marking a move from semi-clandestinity to greater visibility. Police raids on bars did not disappear until the end of the decade. At a 2021 tribute organised by the Casal Lambda, the activist Jordi Petit praised the entrepreneurs who kept bars open in Barcelona and Sitges in those years despite the risk of police interventions and raids, and the association's president, Jordi Samsó, said the Gaixample was born out of exclusion and the lack of leisure spaces for LGBT people. The name Gaixample itself came into use only around 2000.

== History ==
Metro opened in 1989, when gay nightlife was still concentrated in Ciutat Vella and Gràcia. Its founder, Josep Maria Coll, later recalled that Metro and the nearby bar El Punto, part of Grupo Arena, helped lay the first stone of the future Gaixample. A new generation of entrepreneurs and customers wanted larger venues with high ceilings, which the wide ground floors of the Eixample made possible. By the 1990s the club was already drawing many tourists, as one of the first references for LGBT visitors to the city. A 2018 guide to the history of sexualities in Barcelona, published by the Museu d'Història de Barcelona, lists Metro among the city's first gay discotheques of the 1980–1990 period, alongside Arena and Martin's.

Coll's earlier career was in the theatre. According to El Punt in 2006, he had been at the head of the Arnau and the Teatre Victòria before becoming the owner of Metro and of the Sala Muntaner. In 2004 La Vanguardia reported that the Sala Muntaner, an alternative theatre in Barcelona, kept going thanks to the nightclub, which channelled part of its profits into the theatre's activity. When the theatre closed abruptly in the summer of 2018, Coll was its director and Javier Urbasos its manager, both also running the club at the time. He also took part, as a businessman running LGBT venues, in a seminar at Santa Coloma de Gramenet on homosexuals and transsexuals as victims of Francoist repression, in a session on the passage from clandestine venues to LGBT entrepreneurs.

== Programming ==
Live performance was part of the club's programme from its early years. In 1991 and 1992 La Vanguardia announced one-off appearances at the club by the Argentine performer Ángel Pavlovsky, whom a 2018 guide published by the Museu d'Història de Barcelona names among the leading figures of the city's transformista scene when it reached its peak. The club opened every night of the week, with daily shows. Time Out described its Monday cabaret, by La Troupe Folies, as a classic of the city's gay scene, and listed a New Year's Eve party that used both rooms, with four DJs, go-go dancers and strippers.

The Monday cabaret was held every week and its lineup changed from month to month. It included the company Zoologic, with the Shimai sisters among its performers, and the transformistas Juan Reina, Alba and Secre, while The Chanclettes and La Terremoto de Alcorcón had also appeared there over the years. The club also held a year-end special session that included a live sex show, and the Xtreme Party, organised by the porn actor David Ávila during the Circuit Festival, which was restricted to men and had a strict dress code of leather, military, sportswear or rubber, with shows by several porn actors. In 2016 the Barcelona nightclub owners' association described Metro and Arena as two reference points of the city's gay scene, noting a live show every Monday and Sundays with Toni Arroyo.

== AIDS fundraising ==
Metro took part in the response to the AIDS crisis. On 1 June 1995 it hosted a benefit party for the Fundació de Lluita Contra la Sida. Coll had decided that the club was an ideal space for a fundraising event and contacted the foundation, based at the Hospital Germans Trias i Pujol (Can Ruti) in Badalona, then the second centre in Catalonia for the treatment of AIDS patients after the Hospital Clínic. The night's proceeds, from admission and drinks, went to the foundation.

The foundation was created in 1992 at the Hospital Germans Trias i Pujol by Bonaventura Clotet, who has also directed the AIDS research institute IrsiCaixa since 1995. Its annual fundraising gala, People in Red, was described by Ara in 2022 as the most important charity event held annually in Catalonia, and in 2026 as the most powerful charity gala in Spain.

La Vanguardia described Metro as one of the favourite meeting places of the city's gay community and considered the benefit party timely, since the publicly sponsored AIDS prevention campaigns of earlier years had faded from view. It also pointed out that the epidemic was by no means a problem exclusive to gay men. The television presenter Fina Brunet hosted the 1995 benefit party, and the guests included the actress Loles León, the film director Ventura Pons, the basketball coaches Aíto García Reneses and Pedro Martínez, and members of the theatre company La Cubana. Germán Torres presented his show Montand de mon temps, and the singer Javier Gurruchaga, unable to attend, sent a recording of "Condón club", a song from his forthcoming album. The foundation's president, Bonaventura Clotet, said that the money raised was welcome but that the important thing was to keep raising awareness, and that an event like this had served its purpose if it prevented a single infection.

A second benefit party with the foundation was announced for the night of 20 June 1996, starting at 11:30 pm, with tickets from 1,000 pesetas, to raise funds for AIDS research. The programme was built around the singer Miguel Comamala's show of Jacques Brel songs, and the presence of Victoria Abril, Loles León and Loquillo, among others, had been confirmed.

== Public profile ==
The club's profile extended beyond the LGBT community. In November 1995, in a feature on politicians' nightlife, La Vanguardia's VANG magazine photographed Francesc López, identified as a deputy mayor for the PSC, entering Metro, which it described as one of the best-known gay venues in Barcelona.

== The venue ==
The club occupied 240 square metres on two floors, reached by going down a flight of stairs, and its slogan was "Bajo tierra está el cielo" ("Heaven is underground"). It had two dance floors, one playing house and dance music and the other pop and Latin music, and a dark room. In the room playing house and dance music, according to the columnist Francesc Soler, talking to someone meant shouting in their ear. Time Out noted that it was particularly crowded at weekends and listed admission at €15, with opening hours from midnight to 5 am from Sunday to Thursday and to 6 am on Friday and Saturday. Photographs of the empty interior in the 2021 rental listing still showed the colourful mural that decorated the entrance.

== Dark room ==
The larger of the club's two rooms, which played house music, had podiums, a table football and a dark room. Time Out described the dark room as corridor-like and as the place where "the real action takes place". Soler described it as busy, a place where more than one patron would disappear for a while on the pretext of going to the toilet or ordering a beer at the bar. A party organised at the club by POPair was announced with the pool table and the dark room open to all. In 2023 the actor and presenter Santi Millán recalled on the RTVE programme LateXou that a basketball arcade machine stood in front of the dark room, and that he and his friend José Corbacho once went in to retrieve a ball that had bounced inside.

== Closure ==
Metro closed in April 2021 after months shut under COVID-19 restrictions. The closure became public when a real-estate sign appeared on the façade and the premises were advertised for rent at €1,800 a month. The club made no official announcement, and news of the closure prompted many messages of nostalgia on social media. The press presented it as one more casualty of the pandemic among the city's LGBT venues, though it noted that Metro had been losing customers for years to newer venues and changing leisure habits. The columnist Francesc Soler wrote that the club deserved to have closed with a memorable farewell party rather than unnoticed, and that its decline began well before the pandemic. Ramon Ramió, a Gaixample restaurateur, told VilaWeb in 2023 that Metro had closed over a rent dispute. In June 2022 the premises were reported to be turning into a branch of the Good Bubble tea franchise.

== Legacy ==
After the closure, the television presenter Jorge Javier Vázquez, who studied at the University of Barcelona nearby, recalled going to Metro alone in his student years and associating the club with his sexual awakening. Ramió told VilaWeb that he had met his partner at Metro in 2000 and that its closure was traumatic for him and several friends. He described a typical night out as a gay-friendly dinner, then a bar or club, and finally a sauna, a route that in his view is now followed mainly by older patrons, since young people go out everywhere and have less money to spend and use dating apps.
