= Museum of Modernism Barcelona =

- Museu del Modernisme de Barcelona
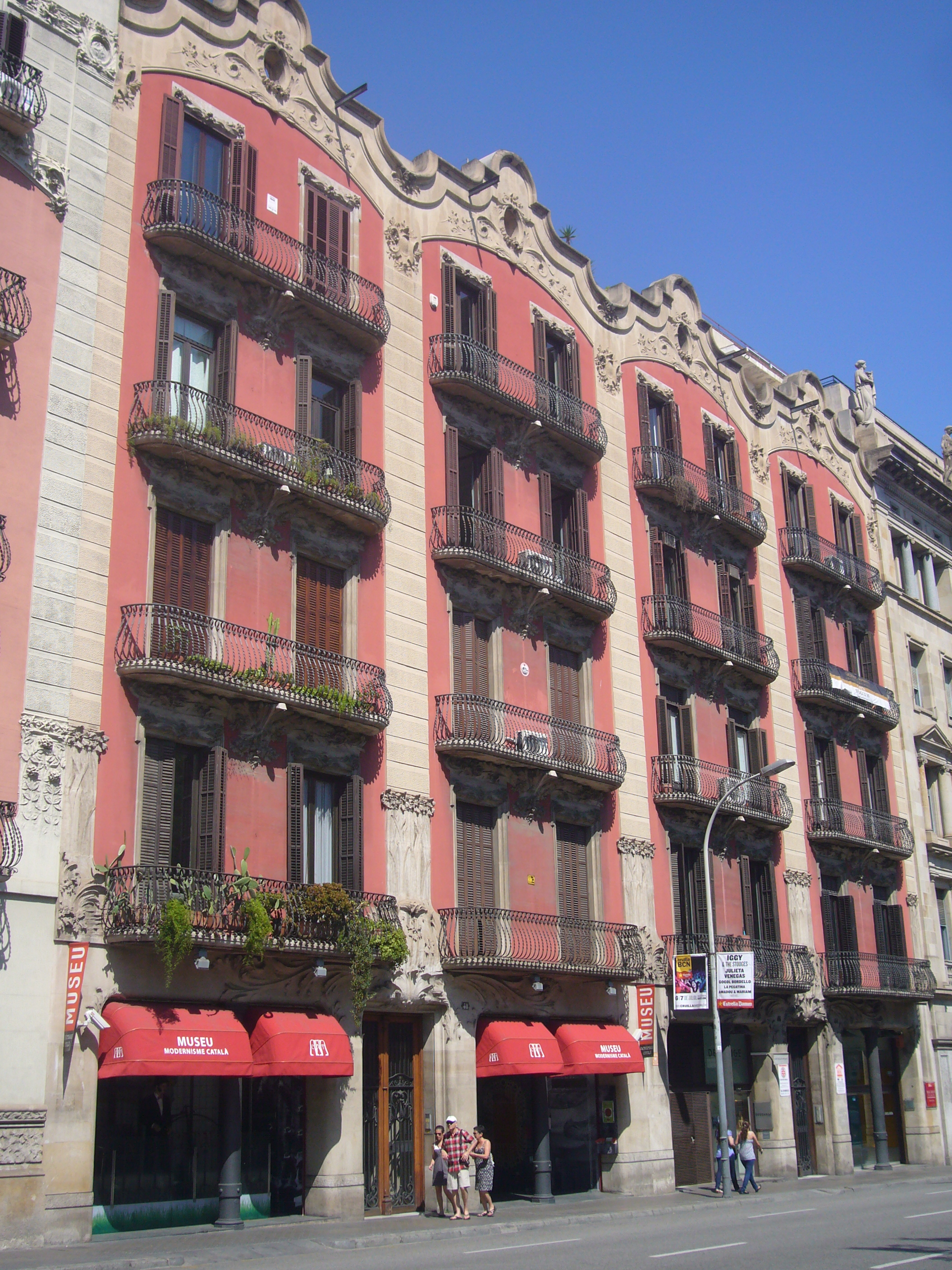
- Former name: Museu del Modernisme Català
- Location: Carrer de Balmes, Barcelona, Catalonia, Spain
- Coordinates: 41°23′19.90″N 2°09′48.74″E
- Type: Art museum
- Director: Gabriel Pinós

The Museum of Modernism Barcelona,, also called the Museum of Catalan Modernism (Catalan: Museu del Modernisme Català) (MMCAT), was opened in 2010 and occupies two floors of a modernist building by architect Enric Sagnier, on the Carrer de Balmes 48, in Barcelona.

== Permanent exhibitions ==
On the upper floor, decorative arts, mostly made of wood, are on display. Mainly, the space is divided into three rooms where there is respectively the work of Joan Busquets, Gaspar Homar and Antoni Gaudí.
