= Hotel Telégrafo =

Historic hotel in Havana, Cuba

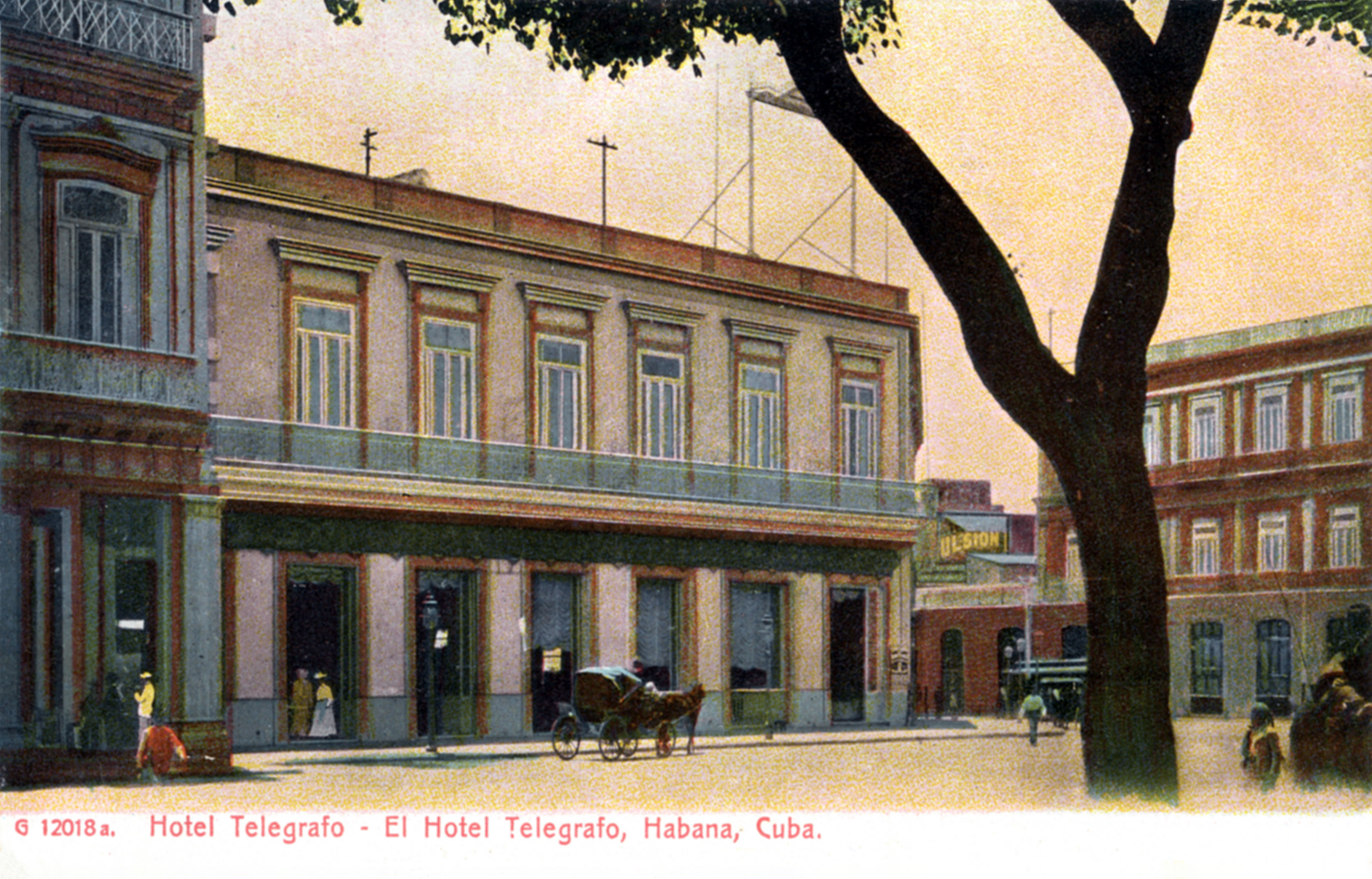
- Alternative names: Telégrafo Axel Hotel La Habana

General information
- Location: Havana, La Habana Province, Cuba
- Coordinates: 23°8′16.6″N 82°21′33.92″W
- Opened: 1888

Website
- www.axelhotels.com

Hotel Telégrafo (English: Telegraph Hotel) is a historic hotel in Havana, Cuba. The Telégrafo is owned by the international hotel chain, Axel Hotels.

== Early history ==
The Grand Hotel Telégrafo opened in 1860. It was reestablished in 1888 on Paseo del Prado, near the National Capitol of Cuba, facing Parque Central in Havana, Cuba.

In 1892, it was managed by Gonzalez & Giralt, Proprietors. In 1893, the Souvenir of the Grand Hotel Telégrafo was published by J.C. Prince. Other Hotel Telegrafo locations existed in Sagua La Grande and Camajuaní.

The 1902 International Sanitary Congress took place at the Hotel Telégrafo.

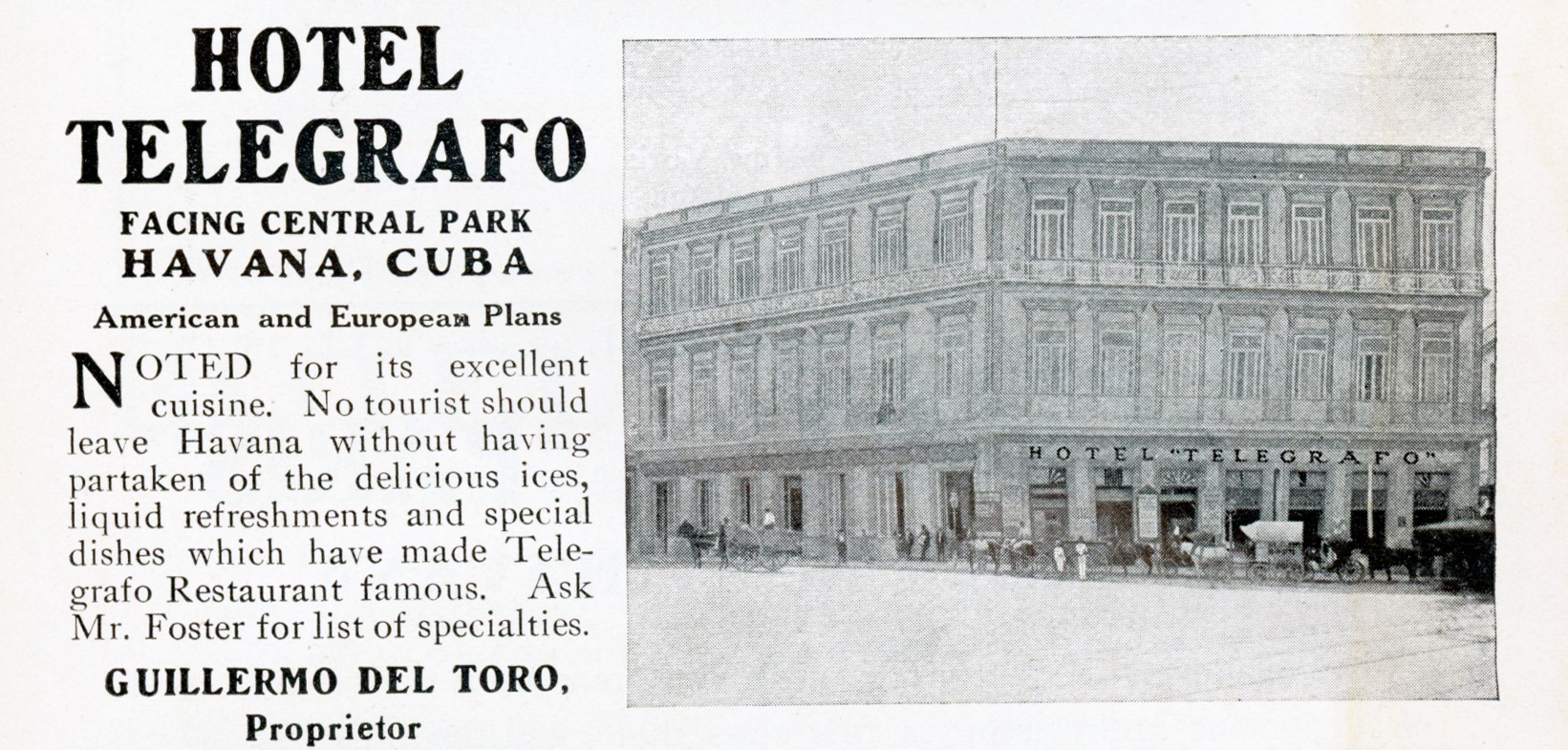
Advertisement for Hotel Telégrafo, Havana, Cuba

In 1905, Guillermo Del Toro was the hotel's proprietor. The hotel hired interpreters as guides covering Havana, Marianao, and Matanzas for American visitors. The Café Helados de Paris (English: Paris Ice Cream Café) specializing in ice cream was connected to the hotel.

By 1915, the old Hotel Telégrafo building was demolished, and a completely new one was constructed. After new management and ownership took over in 1915, an expert chef directed the cuisine at Hotel Telégrafo.

The hotel, a favorite in the late 19th century, was adversely affected by the Cuban Revolution of 1959. It was reconstructed in 2001 and reopened the following year.

After being acquired by the Spanish hotel chain Axel Hotels, it was renamed Telégrafo Axel Hotel La Habana. The former Telégrafo reopened in 2022 as the first state-run LBGTIQ+-friendly hotel.
