= Francisco de Albear =

Cuban civil engineer (1816–1887)

Francisco de Albear y Fernández de Lara
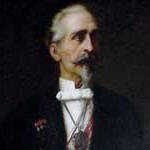
- Francisco de Albear y Fernández de Lara
- Born: January 11, 1816; Havana
- Died: October 22, 1887 (aged 71); Havana
- Occupation: Engineer
- Known for: Havana aqueduct

Francisco de Albear y Fernández de Lara (January 11, 1816, Havana – October 22, 1887, Havana) was a Spanish engineer from Cuba.

== Biography ==
Son of Colonel Francisco de Albear y Hernández, governor of the Morro Castle of Havana he was sent to study in mainland Spain and graduated in 1839 from the Military Engineering School of Guadalajara, Spain, with the rank of lieutenant. He was assigned to the Corps of Engineers of Cuba in 1845. Eventually, he reached the rank of brigadier general of the Royal Corps of Engineers, being in charge of over 182 projects in Cuba. He also was involved in scientific research, and was member of various scientific institutions among which: the Royal Academy of Sciences of Madrid (Spanish Royal Academy of Sciences ) (corresponding member), the Royal Geographic Society of Spain (Real Sociedad Geográfica de España) (founding member), the Scientific Society of Brussels (Société Scientifique de Bruxelles) the Royal Economic Society of the Friends of the Country of Havana (Sociedad Económica de los Amigos del País de la Habana) and the Royal Academy of Medical, Physical and Natural Sciences of Havana (Real Academia de Ciencias Médicas, Físicas y Naturales de La Habana), being vicepresident of the latter.

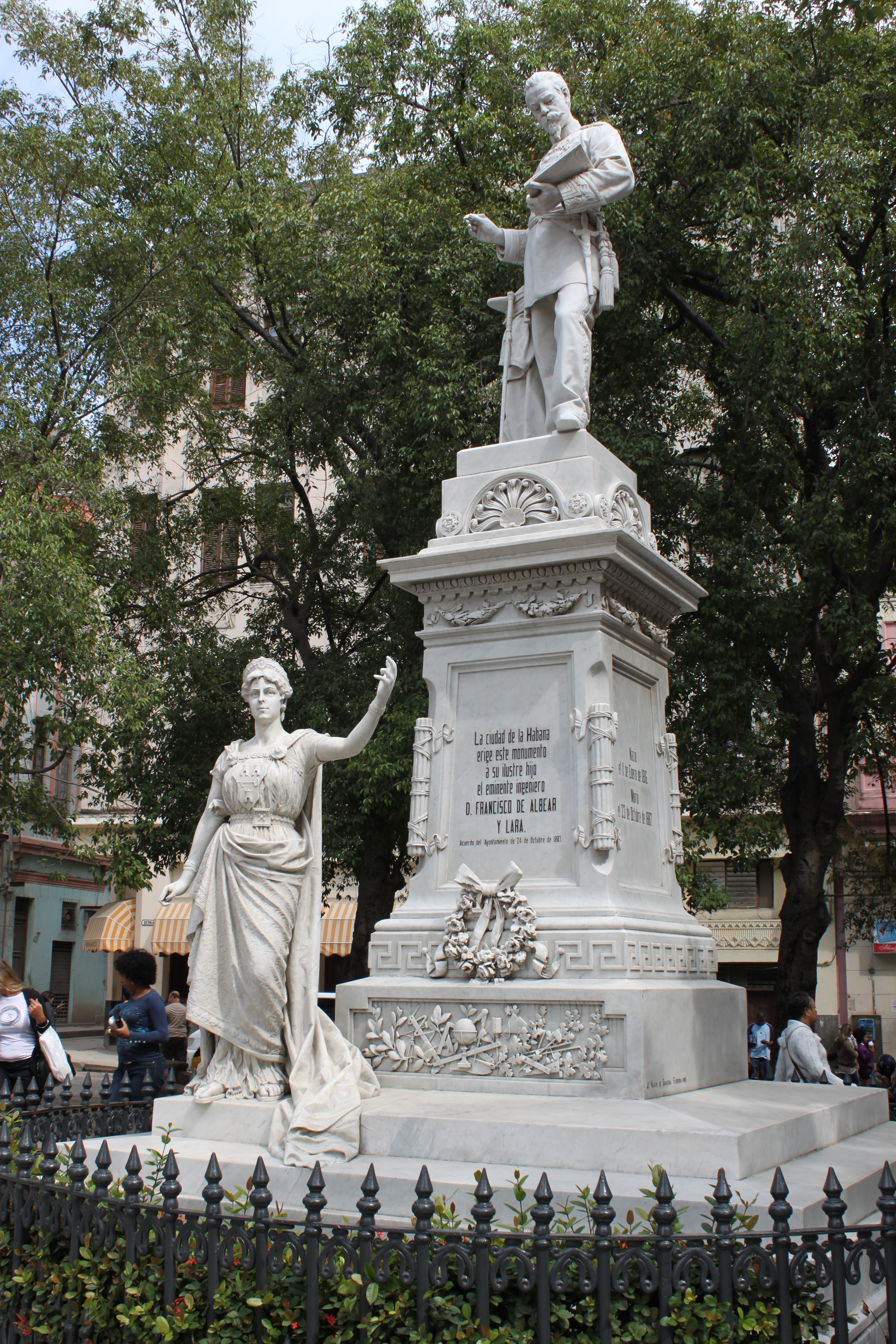
Statue of Francisco de Albear by Cuban sculptor José Vilalta Saavedra in Havana

His main achievement was the project for the catchment of the Vento springs and their conveyance to Havana for the water supply of the city, now known as the Acueducto de Albear. The project was designed in 1855 and the construction started in 1861, being completed only in 1893. The project was distinguished with the Gold Medal of the Éxposition universelle of Paris 1878. The aqueduct is still in operation.

For his merits he was awarded the title of marquess of San Felipe and distinguished with the Great Cross of the Royal and Military Order of San Hermenegildo, Knight of the Royal and military order of San Fernando (Real y militar Orden de San Fernando) and the Order of Military Merit.

A park in Havana is named after Francisco de Albear and a statue by José Vilalta Saavedra was erected in the park and inaugurated on March 15, 1895.

== See also ==
- Acueducto de Albear
- José Vilalta Saavedra
