= Axel Hotels =

Spanish hotel chain

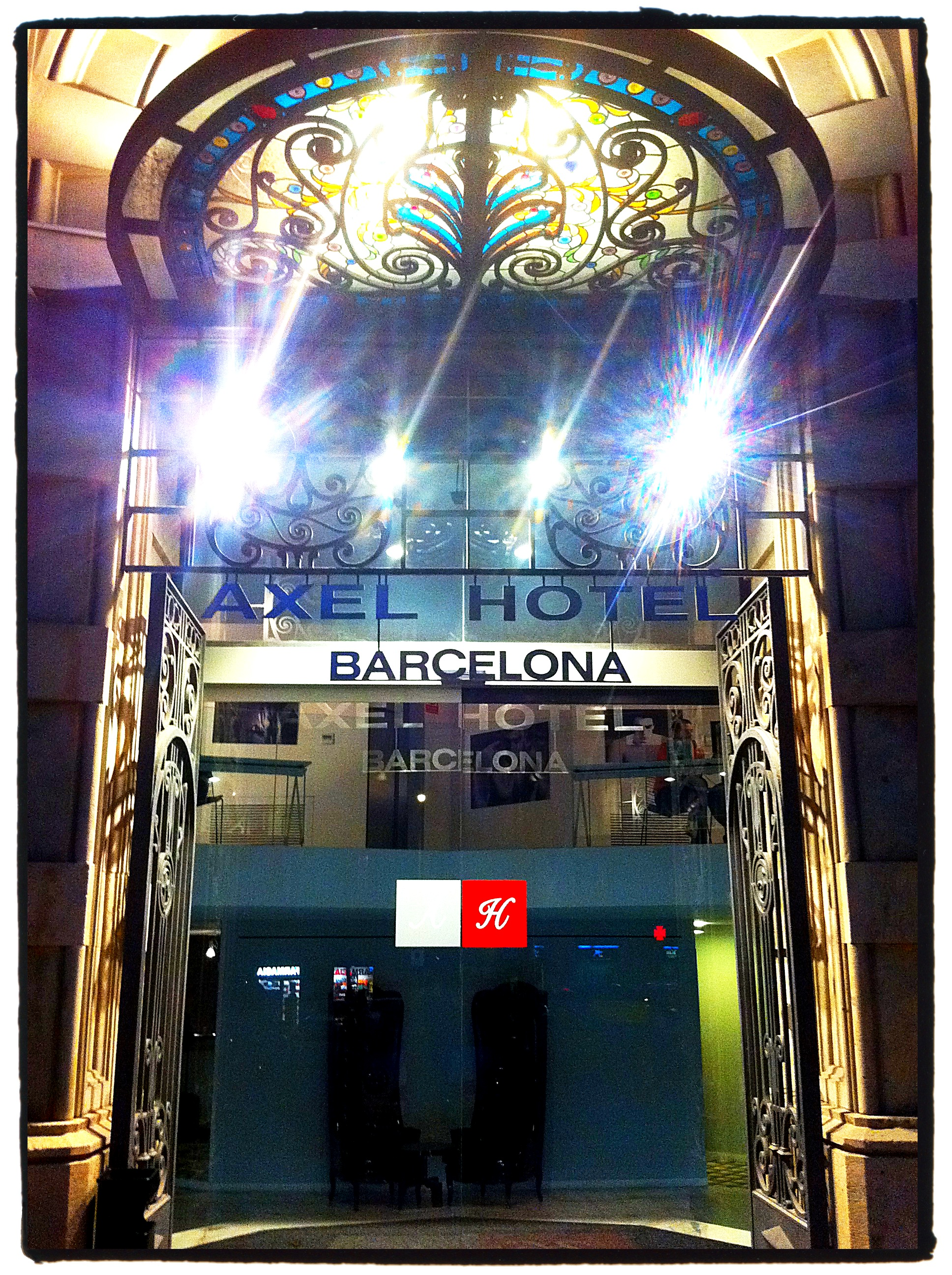
- Company type: Private
- Industry: Hotels, Hospitality
- Founded: 2003; 23 years ago
- Headquarters: Barcelona, Spain
- Key people: Juan P. Julia Blanch (Founder and president); Albert Olivé (CEO)
- Website: www.axelhotels.com/en/home.html

Axel Hotels is an international hotel chain, parented by the Axel Corporation aimed to the LGBTQ+ community. It was founded in 2003 by Juan P. Julia Blanch and known as the first LGBT and hetero-friendly hotel chain. Albert Olivé is currently the CEO of the hotel chain.

== History ==
The idea to create a hotel was the desire to build a place where LGBT people could feel free and comfortable, where diversity is the main value. The first hotel of the chain was opened in 2003 by Barcelona, Spain. In 2007, the hotel was opened in Buenos Aires, Argentina and in 2009 in Berlin, Germany. According to Axel Hotels, about 75% of hotel guests are LGBT and 25% are guests with heterosexual orientation.

In 2010, Axel Hotels was recognized as the leader in the field of gay tourism in the Best Hotel category.

== Hotel network ==
Axel Hotels currently has a total of 10 locations, with 6 in Spain and 4 in other countries.

Location	Opening date	Rooms	Neighbourhood
Barcelona, Spain	June 2003	101	Gaixample
Ibiza, Spain	May 2017	100	Sant Antonio bay
Madrid, Spain	August 2017	88	Atocha Street at Barrio de las Letras
San Sebastián, Spain	November 2019	100	city center
Berlin, Germany	March 2009	87	Schöneberg District
Venice, Italy	March 2019	43	La Salute, Sestiere Dorsoduro
Miami, Florida, United States	January 2020	160	Collins Avenue, South Beach, Miami

AxelBeach are summer resorts with apartments:

Location	Opening date	Apartments	Neighbourhood
Maspalomas, Canary Islands, Spain	May 2013	92	Playa del Inglés
Crete, Greece	2026	54	Hersonissos

Branches of Two Hotel by Axel are located in:

Location	Opening date	Rooms	Neighbourhood
Barcelona, Spain	July 2015	87	Gaixample
Berlin, Germany	January 2017	86	Charlottenburg-Wilmersdorf

=== Barcelona ===
Axel Hotel Barcelona is the first hotel of the chain. It was opened in July 2003 in Gaixample District, Barcelona and rated in the four-star category. The hotel is located in a chic building of the XIX century and has 101 rooms. In 2015, another hotel, called Two Hotel by Axel, was opened in the southern part of the Gaixample District in Barcelona.

=== Berlin ===
The three-star Axel Hotel Berlin, located in the Berlin district of Schöneberg and built by the architect Iñigo Hernaádez Tobe. It was inaugurated by Berlin mayor Klaus Wowereit on March 17, 2009. The hotel has 86 rooms, as well as a large sports center with sauna, steam bath, and massage parlour. It is not the property of Axel Corp., but is leased and managed by the group. In 2017, they opened another property, called Two Hotel by Axel, at Charlottenburg-Wilmersdorf, Berlin.

=== Buenos Aires ===
Axel Hotel Buenos Aires was opened on October 31, 2007 in the historic centre of the Argentine capital, San Telmo. The hotel had 48 rooms and offers its clients a restaurant, cocktail bar, spa, garden with swimming pool and solarium. "It was closed on 2013 due to the unsafe situation at the city.

=== Venezia ===
Axel Hotels started first “hetero-friendly” hotel in Italy, Axel Hotel Venezia (Venice) in 2019. The hotel has 43 rooms.

=== Gran Canaria ===
AxelBeach Maspalomas is located on the Spanish island of Gran Canaria in the Playa del Inglés. It has 92 apartments.

=== Ibiza ===
AxelBeach Ibiza is a beach property, located on the landscape in Cala de Bou, next to Sant Antonio bay in the Balearic Islands of Spain. The hotel has 96 rooms with pool deck and bar.

=== San Sebastián ===
Alex Hotel San Sebastián was opened in November 2019. It is located in the city centre of San Sebastián, Spain and has 100 rooms.

=== Miami ===
An Axel Hotel branch is on Collins Avenue, South Beach, Miami, United States.
