= Albear Aqueduct =

Water-supply system of Havana, Cuba

- Acueducto de Albear
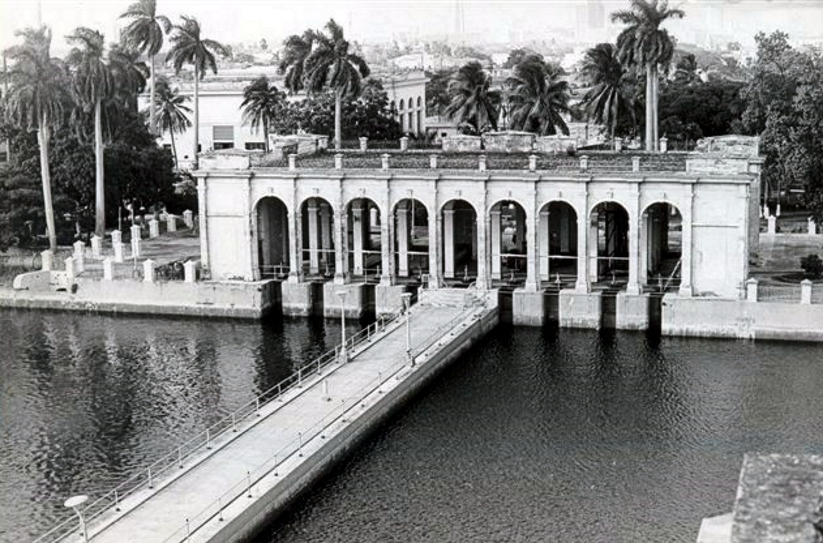
- Palatine Deposit
- Interactive map of the Albear Aqueduct area

General information
- Location: Havana, Cuba
- Coordinates: 23.07694°N 82.38694°W
- Construction started: 1861
- Completed: 1893

Design and construction
- Engineer: Francisco de Albear

The Acueducto de Albear is the name of a water supply system of the city of Havana, Cuba, built in the 19th century by Francisco de Albear.

== Background ==
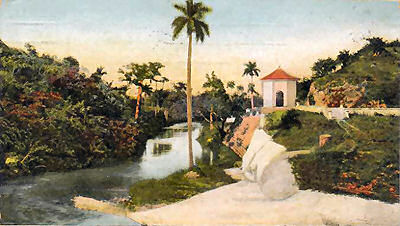
Canal of the aqueduct – View in 1900

At the beginning of the 19th century, there was a severe shortage of water. After having negotiated with several French engineers in 1852, the Governor of Cuba José Gutiérrez de la Concha decided to create a commission to propose solutions for the water supply. The commission was to be chaired by Francisco de Albear, at that time colonel of the Corps of Engineers of the Spanish army and chairman of the Public Works Committee of Cuba. His main assistant was José Luis Casaseca, Director of the Institute of Chemical Investigations of Havana. The construction of a new water supply system was a necessity for the improvement of the sanitary conditions of the city. There had been severe outbreaks of cholera in 1850, 1856, 1865 and 1867-1870. The mortality due to dysentery and other waterborne diseases.

== Investigation ==
The investigations carried out by De Albear's team were extensive; he investigated various alternatives among which the use of the Luyanó, Martín Pérez, Guasabacoa, Marianao or Almendares rivers as well of the Cacahual or del Calvario springs all of which he rejected for various reasons. He finally settled for the use of the del Vento springs, both due to the superior water quality and for the possibility of conveying the water by gravity, the source being located 41 meters higher than the city. Chemical studies carried out by José Luis Casaseca lead to the conclusion that the water of the del Vento springs had to be isolated from the Almendares River to prevent a deterioration of the water quality which was of great concern due to the tropical location of the island.

However, it was only in 1855, that a second commission, chaired also by Francisco de Albear, started extensive geological and hydrological field surveys, to ascertain that the springs had the capacity to cover the water requirements of the city. Finally, on November 25, 1855 De Albear was able to present his report to Governor José Gutiérrez de la Concha.

Copies of the report were sent to the Ministers of Interior (Ministro de Gobernación) and of Public Works (Ministro de Fomento) in Madrid. The "Royal Decree for the conveyance of the water of the Vento springs to Havana" was signed on October 5, 1858. To ensure the financing, the decree suspended for three years all payments from the revenue generated by the Fernando II aqueduct, imposed an annual fee of 45 pesos for each water faucet and authorized the governorship to raise another 500,000 pesos through taxes, if necessary.

On February 18, 1859, Governor Gutiérrez de la Concha created the Administration of the de Vento canal, Board of Directors.

== Components of the project ==
Though called an aqueduct, the project presented by De Albear is complex water supply system, including the following components:

- dams for the creation of storage ponds for the water of the springs
- Hydraulic structures in the Vento gully
- De-silting structures
- Tunnel for the crossing of the Almendares River
- canal for conveyance of water to the city
- water treatment plant
- water storage tanks and water towers
- the water distribution network in the city.

== Technical features ==
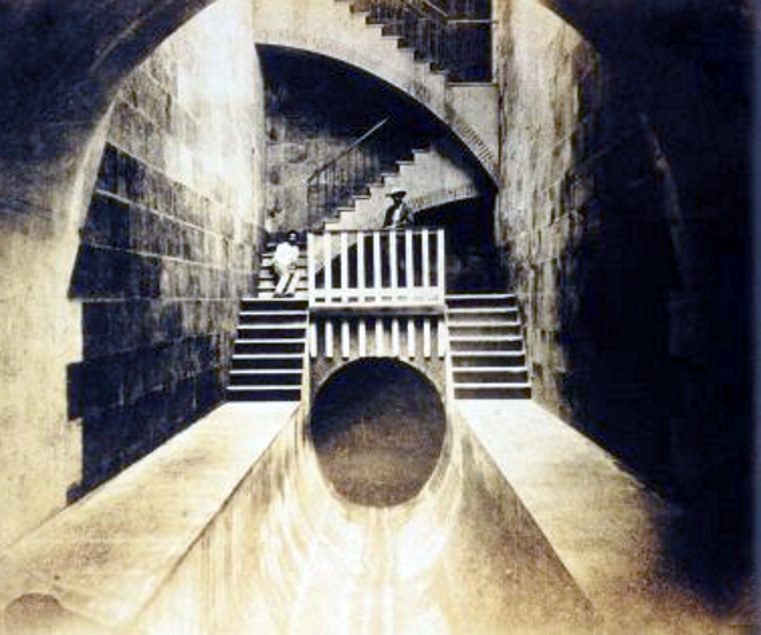
Albear Aqueduct

The canal has an oval cross section, being 2.40 m deep and having a maximum width of 1.98 m. With a slope of 1:5000 it can convey a discharge of 1.67 m^{3}/s (144,000 m^{3}/day) at normal water levels. However, at higher water levels the capacity of the canal can be increased to 302,800 m^{3}/day. It should be taken into account that, according to the standards in force at the time the canal was designed, the water requirement was of 500 litres per day per inhabitant

== Construction of the water supply system ==
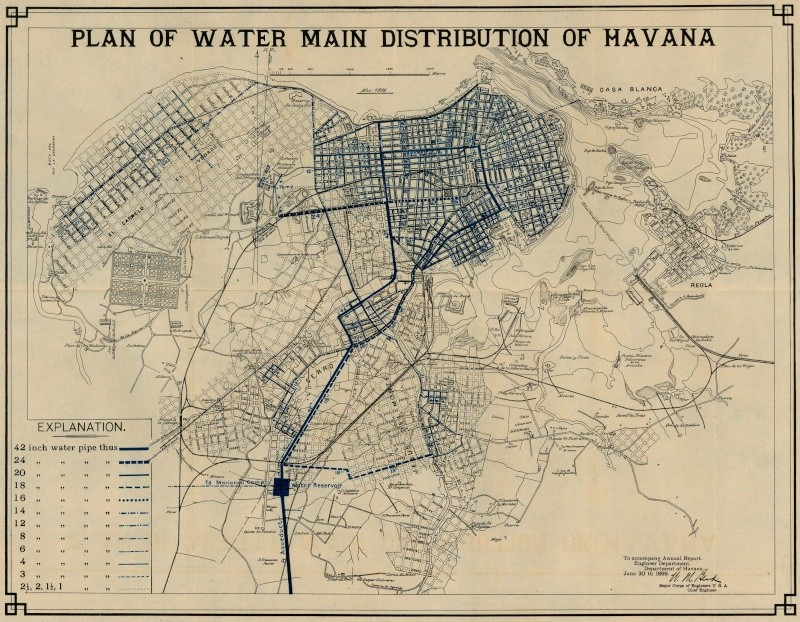
From the 56th Congress, 1st Session. House of Representatives. Document No. 2. Annual Reports of the War Department for the Fiscal Year Ended June 30, 1899. Washington: Government Printing Office. Havana Map, Showing Plan of Water Main Distribution, Cuba. 1899

In 1861, the construction started under the direction of Francisco de Albear. The progress was however extremely slow due to the scarcity of available funds and to the disturbances created by the Ten Years' War.

Work on the water distribution network started only in 1874 when Francisco de Albear made the first complete topographic survey of Havana and produced a 1:5000 plan of the city. Based on these surveys, he completed the design of the network and fixed the location of the water storage tanks.

In the meanwhile, the water supply of the city had worsened, as a result of the project's construction delays. After the Peace of Zanjón was signed with the independentist rebels on February 10, 1878, the first part of the canal could finally be completed and, on June 23, 1878, the link of the De Vento Canal and the filters of the Fernando VII aqueduct could finally be inaugurated by Governor Arsenio Martínez-Campos Antón.

== Completion of the project ==
Francisco de Albear, infected with malaria, was not able to oversee the last part of the project. He died on October 22, 1887, without seeing its completion. The work was continued under the supervision of Joaquín Ruiz, colonel of the Corps of Engineers who had assisted de Albear. The construction of the last part was contracted with an American company and coordinated by E. Sherman Gould, work started on January 31, 1890. The project was inaugurated on January 22, 1893, 32 years after its commencement.

== Expansions ==
An expansion from 1925 to 1931 under the direction of the engineer Montoulieu, and the participation in addition to the engineer Abel Fernández Simón, took place. The population exceeded half a million inhabitants and urban growth had also continued to rise, so it was necessary to build a new Cup in Vento, known as the Taza chica, and another Cup in Acura del Cura, with a driving channel up to Vento. A new booth was also built Turbo-electric pumps in Palatino. In this era created the Garden of the Seasons in the access zone Deposits and remodeled the exterior areas of Vento, with the creation of gardens and the incorporation of trails and ornamental elements. Similarly, the Torre Norte was renovated and elements were added ornamentals in the neocolonial style.

The third expansion of the aqueduct occurred between 1947 and 1948, directed by the engineer Fernández Simón, and involved the installation of a new 66 in (170 cm) diameter pipe between Mazorra and Palatino, passing through Vento, that allowed to drive to the Palatino deposits a flow of forty million gallons per day from Aguada del Cura, which improved the supply of Vedado, Luyanó, the Viper, the Hill and allowed to supply Los Pinos, Arroyo Naranjo and Calvario.

== Awards ==
The project received a prize at the Centennial International Exhibition of 1876 in Philadelphia. It was also distinguished with the Gold Medal of the Éxposition universelle of Paris 1878, where it was considered an engineering masterwork. It is considered, along with the Bacunayagua Bridge, the Tunnel of Havana, and the FOCSA Building, one of the seven wonders of Cuban engineering.

== Conclusion ==
The Albear Aqueduct is still active as it works without electric power and continues using as sole energy the force with which springs from its source. Supplies all five central municipalities of the city of Havana: Havana Vieja, Centro Habana, Cerro, October 10 and Plaza de the Revolution, which is approximately the 12% of the population of Havana today. The Albear Aqueduc was selected by the National Union of Architects and Construction Engineers of Cuba, UNAICC, as one of the Seven Wonders of Engineering in Cuba. In view of its heritage values, on January 9 of 2009, in commemoration of the 193 anniversary of birth of Albear, the Historic Aqueduct System from the city of Havana, which includes the Zanja Real, the Fernando VII Aqueduct and the Albear Aqueduct. It was declared a National Monument of the Republic of Cuba.

== See also ==
- Francisco de Albear
