= Laureate Cross of Saint Ferdinand =

Highest military order and decoration in Spain

Royal and Military Order of Saint Ferdinand
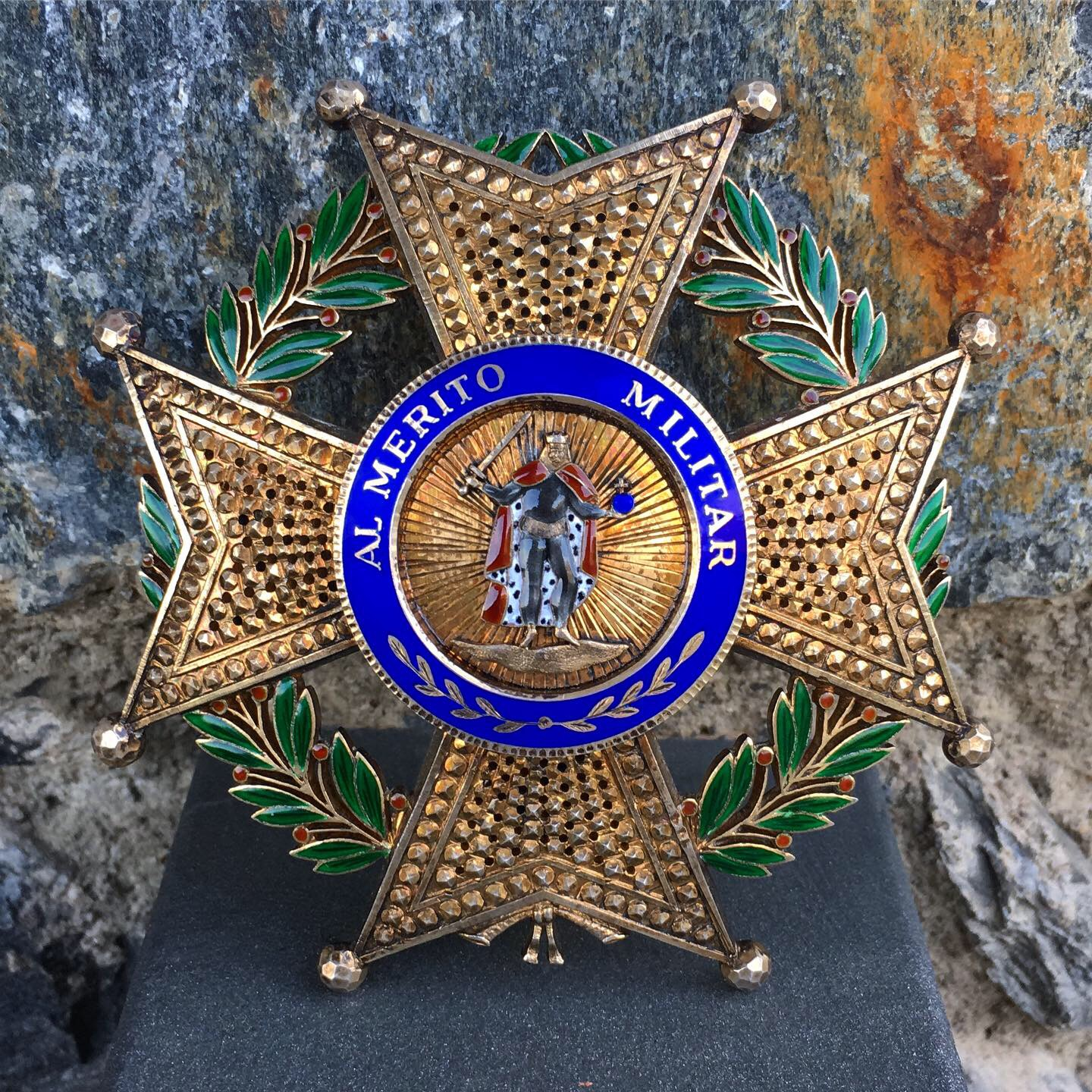
- Grand Laureated star of the Order of Saint Ferdinand

Awarded by the King of Spain
- Type: Military Order of Merit
- Established: August 11, 1811; 214 years ago
- Royal house: House of Bourbon-Anjou
- Eligibility: Military personnel
- Awarded for: Extraordinary military actions to protect the nation, its citizens, or the peace and security of the international community in the face of immediate risk to the bearer
- Status: Currently awarded
- Sovereign: Felipe VI
- President of the Assembly: Miguel Ángel Villarroya, Gran Chancellor of the Royal and Military Order of Saint Hermenegild
- Grades: Laureate Grand Cross; Laureate Cross; Laureate Medal

Precedence
- Next (higher): None
- Next (lower): Military Medal
- Ribbon of the Order

The Laureate Cross

The Royal and Military Order of Saint Ferdinand (Spanish: Real y Militar Orden de San Fernando) is a Spanish military order of chivalry, the decoration of which, the Laureate Cross of Saint Ferdinand (Spanish: Cruz Laureada de San Fernando), is Spain's highest military decoration for gallantry. Membership of the order, which is sometimes abbreviated RMOSF, is awarded in recognition of action, either individual or collective, to protect the nation, its citizens, or the peace and security of the international community in the face of immediate risk to the bearer. Those eligible are current and former members of the Spanish Armed Forces.

The Sovereign of the Order of San Fernando is the monarch of Spain, who presides over the biennial chapter held in the Royal Monastery of El Escorial. The sovereign's representative in the Order is the Grand Master, who governs it and is aided by the Maestranza.

Among the conditions laid out by the Royal Military Order of Saint Ferdinand for the granting of the award are:

- that the sole purpose of the action taken wasn't the saving of one's life;
- that the action was not motivated by improper ambition to honours unnecessarily disregarding one's (or that of one's subordinates) life;
- that, as far as possible, the damage and number of own casualties caused by the action was minimized;
- that the action was taken in the face of significantly adverse odds or other detrimental factors;
- that the action taken made a crucial difference to the situation in which it occurred.

The Royal Military Order of Saint Ferdinand was set up in 1811 by the Cortes of Cádiz – which served as a parliamentary Regency after Ferdinand VII was deposed – to honour heroic feats of arms. It was confirmed by King Ferdinand on his return to Madrid in 1815. Its awardees include Marcelo Azcárraga Palmero, Juan Prim, Juan de la Cruz Mourgeón, Francisco de Albear, José Enrique Varela Iglesias (twice awarded, in 1920, and 1921), Francisco Serrano y Domínguez, Frederick Thomas Pelham, Henry Kelly (VC), Martín Cerezo, Francisco Franco Bahamonde, and Mohamed Meziane.

== See also ==
- Laureate Plate of Madrid
- Category:Laureate Cross of Saint Ferdinand

== Sources ==
- "Real Decreto 899/2001, de 27 de julio, por el que se aprueba el Reglamento de la Real y Militar Orden de San Fernando" [Royal Decree 899/2001, of July 27, approving the Regulations of the Royal and Military Order of San Fernando] (in Spanish) – via www.boe.es.
