= Monument to Columbus (Valladolid) =

Sculpture in Valladolid, Spain

- Monumento a Colón
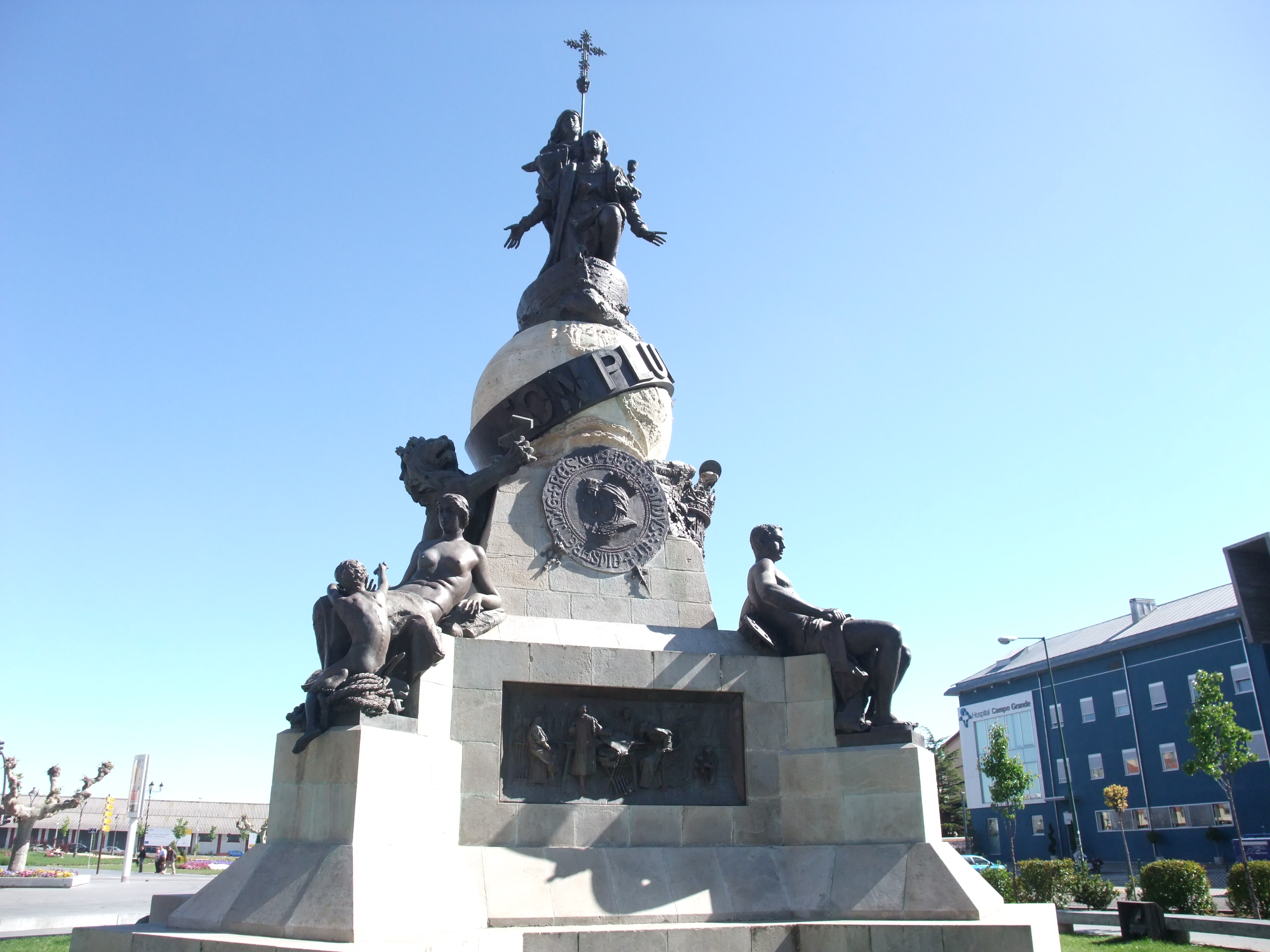
- Interactive map of Monument to Columbus
- Location: Plaza de Colón, Valladolid, Spain
- Coordinates: 41.644444°N 4.727222°W
- Designer: Antonio Susillo
- Material: Bronze, stone, concrete
- Height: 16.40 m
- Weight: 7,000 kg
- Opening date: 14 September 1905
- Dedicated to: Christopher Columbus

The Monument to Columbus (Spanish: Monumento a Colón) is an instance of public art in Valladolid, Spain. Located on the centre of the namesake Plaza de Colón, in the southeastern corner of the Campo Grande, the monument is dedicated to Christopher Columbus.

== History and description ==
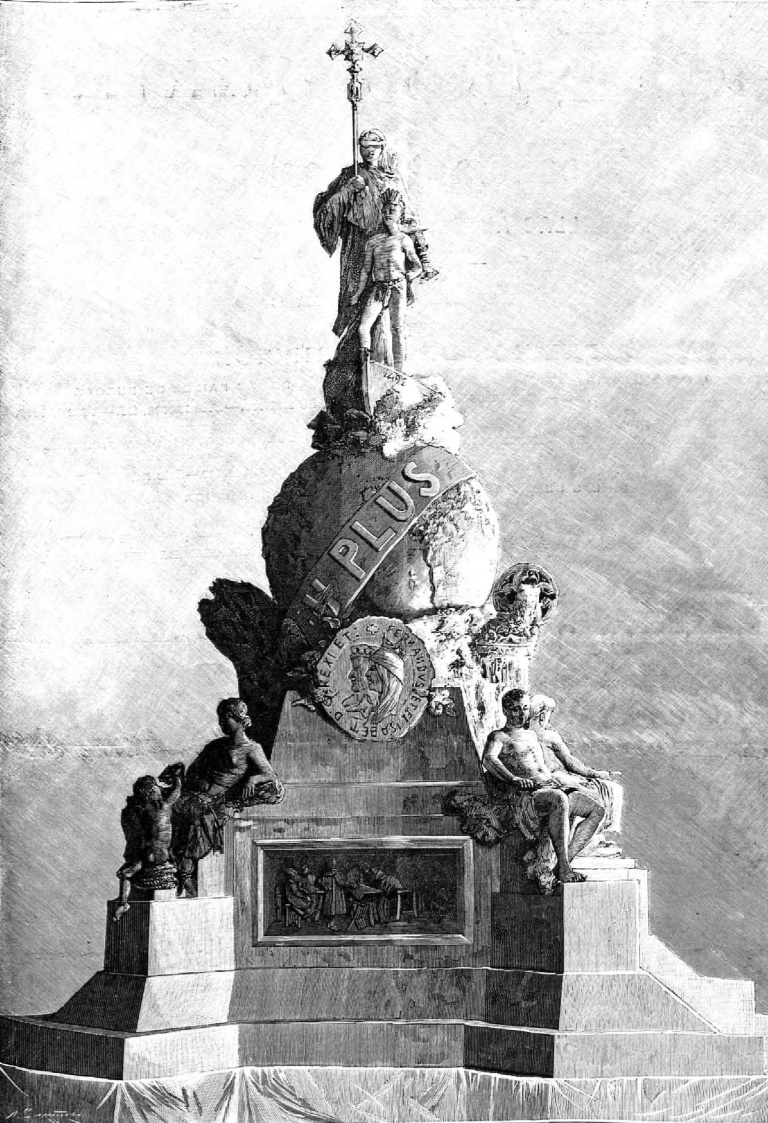
Concept sketch published in La Ilustración Española y Americana (1892)

Conceived in the context of the celebrations for the 400th anniversary of Columbus' arrival to the Americas, the project follows a design by Antonio Susillo (died 1896). Commissioned by the Spanish Government, the bronze parts were cast in Paris at the Thiébaut Frères' foundry. The monument was initially intended to be erected at Havana's Parque Central, yet the Cuban rebellion and ensuing independence from Spain aborted such plans. The bronze elements remained then in Paris while the ashlar pieces were stored in Pontevedra. Valladolid, death place of the Genoese explorer, competed with other Spanish cities such as Seville and Madrid for the monument. The Council of Ministers decided to award the monument to the city of Valladolid in 1901.

The building works relative to the concrete socle were carried out by the Compañía anónima de Hormigón armado de Sestao in 1903. The monumental ensemble was unveiled on 14 September 1905.

Four bronze reliefs on the pedestal illustrate events in the life of Columbus, including the meeting of Columbus with some friars (dominicans from Salamanca or franciscans from La Rábida), the departure from the port of Palos, the arrival to the Americas and the reception by the Catholic Monarchs in Barcelona. Four seated statues representing Study, History, Nautics, and Value lie on the four corners of the monument. The truncated pyramid conforming the middle body of the monument completes with a medallion of the Catholic Monarchs, a regal coats of arms featuring the Eagle of Saint John, an image of the Virgin Mary and a lion crowned by a castle.

Above, the Earth globe, made of white stone from the quarries of Ibeas, is circumvented by a bronze ribbon that reads non plus ultra, with the letter 'n' from the later motto being scratched by the lion from below. Above the globe, a kneeling figure of Columbus and a cloaked and veiled female allegory of Faith holding a cross and a 2-liter chalice top the monument, that stands 16.40 metre high and weighs 7,000 kg.

On 12 October 2019, the monument came out covered in red paint and tagged with a graffiti reading: españolismo es fascismo ("Spanish nationalism is Fascism"). Left-wing and Castilian nationalist youth organization 'Yesca' took credit of the authorship of the vandal attack in social media.

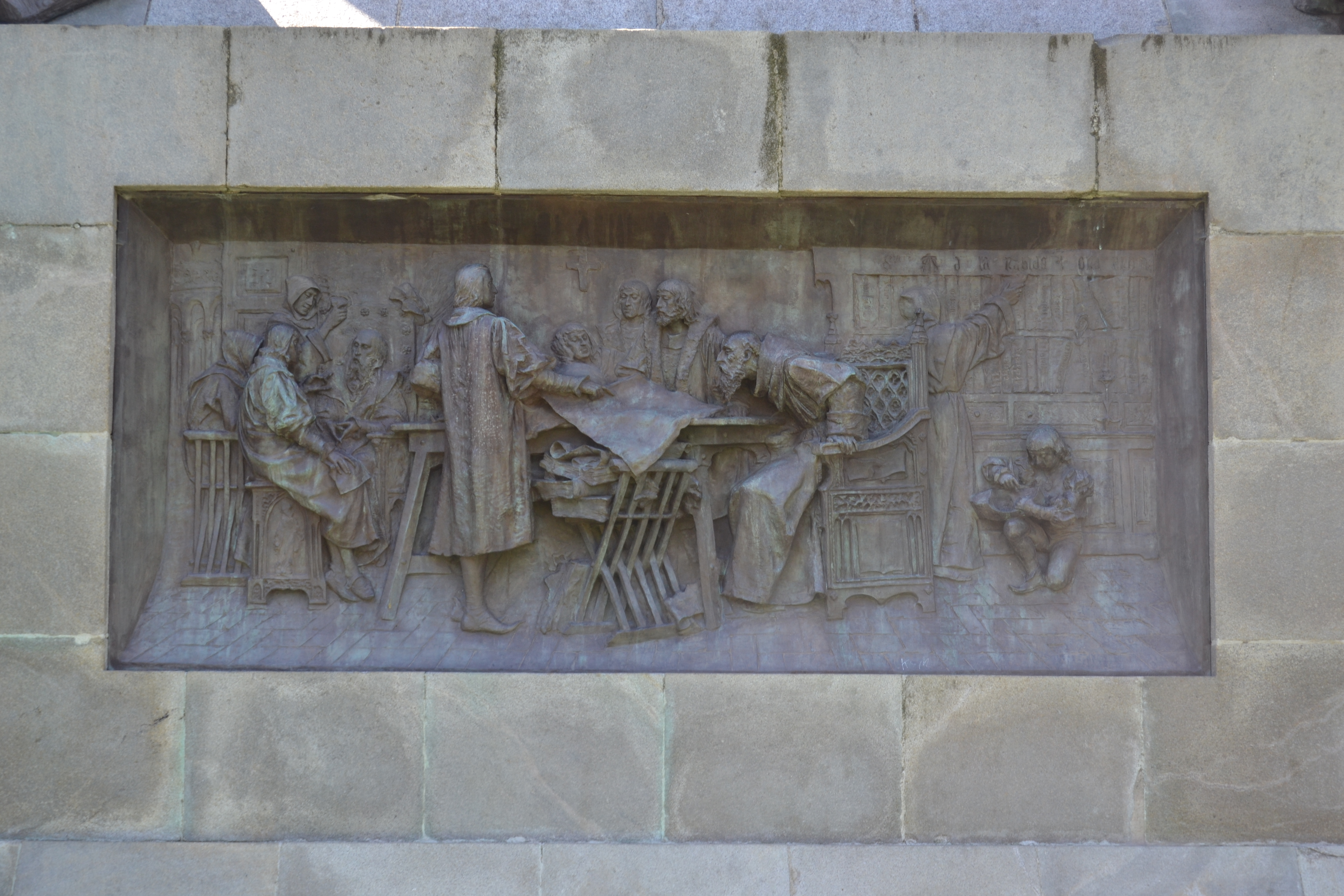
One of the basement's bronze reliefs

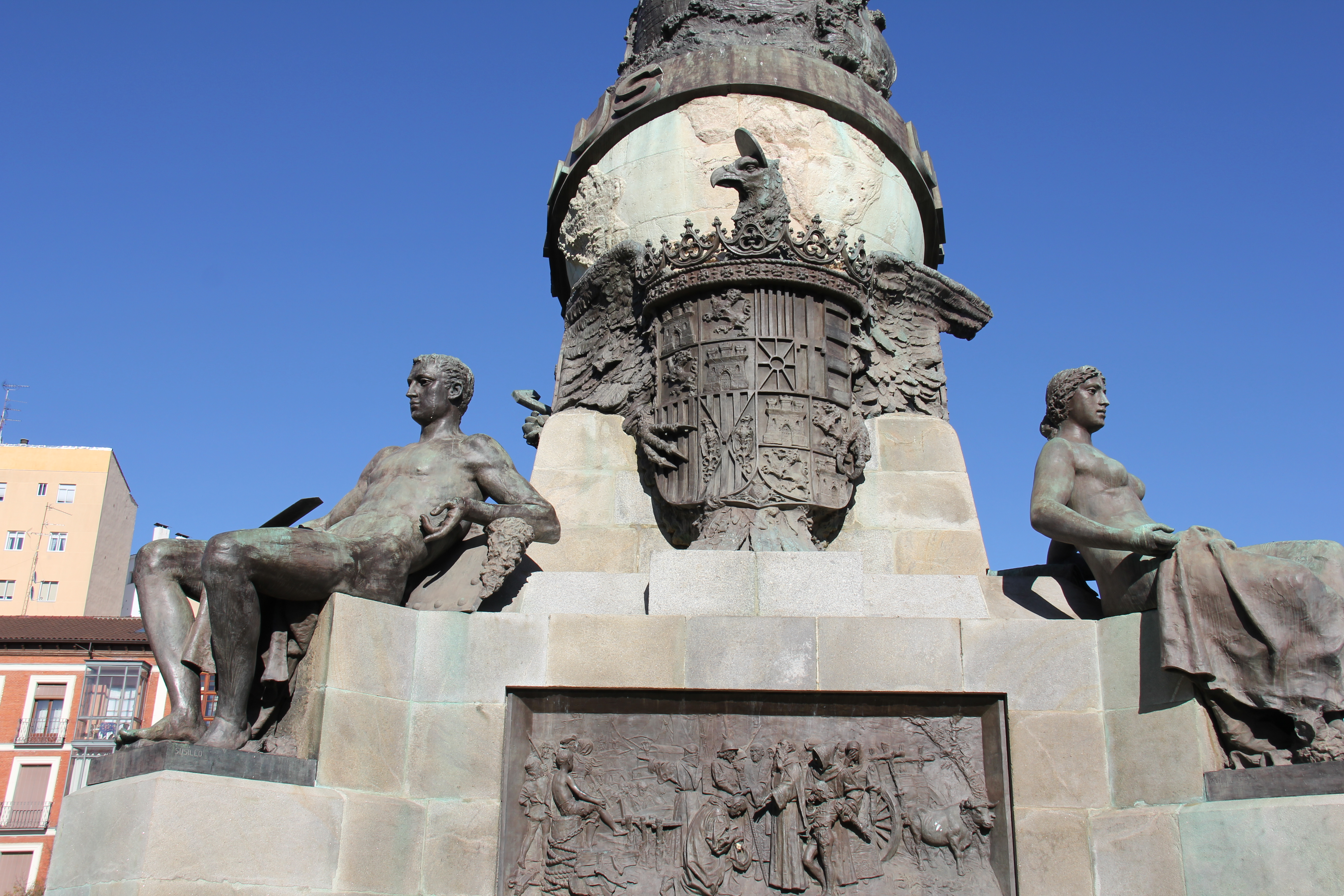
The coat of arms

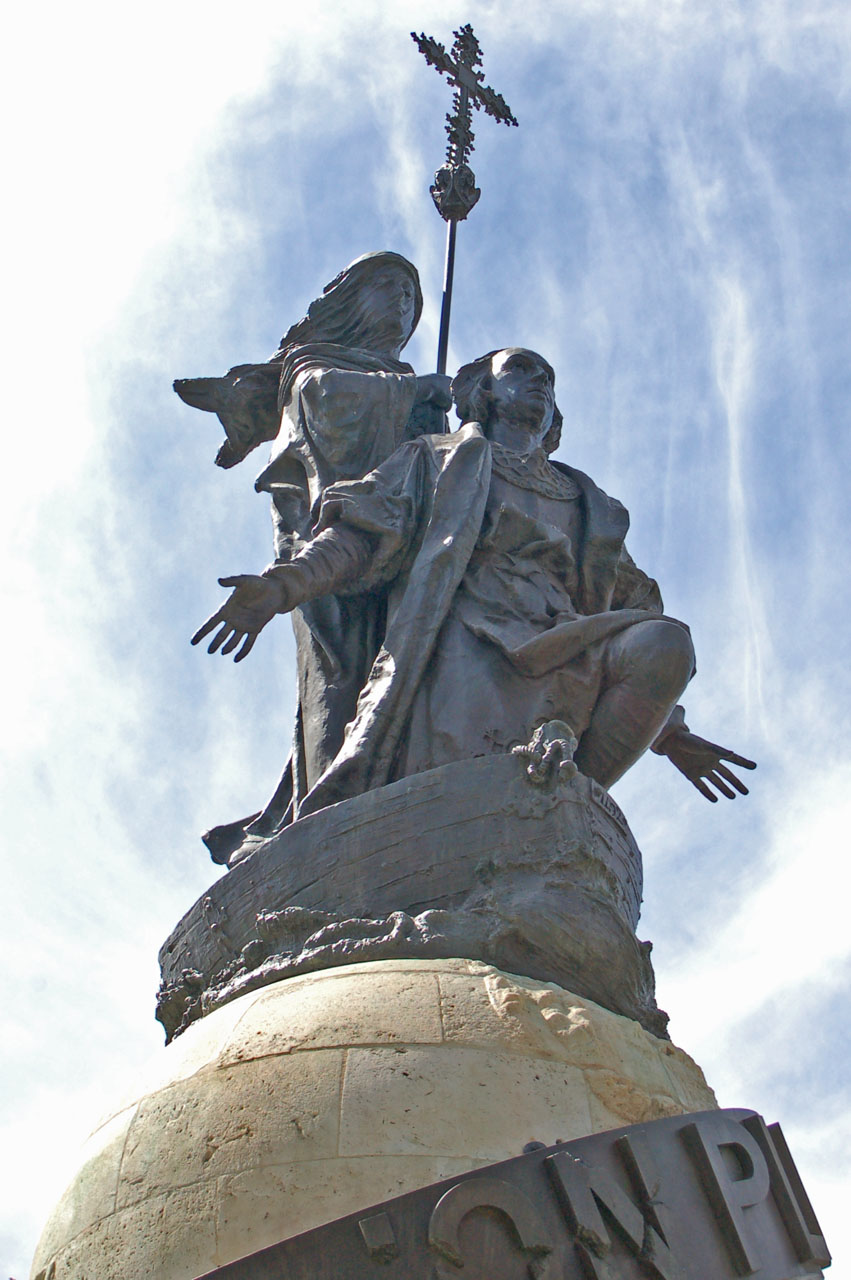
Columbus and Faith

== See also ==
- List of monuments and memorials to Christopher Columbus
