= José Vilalta Saavedra =

Cuban sculptor

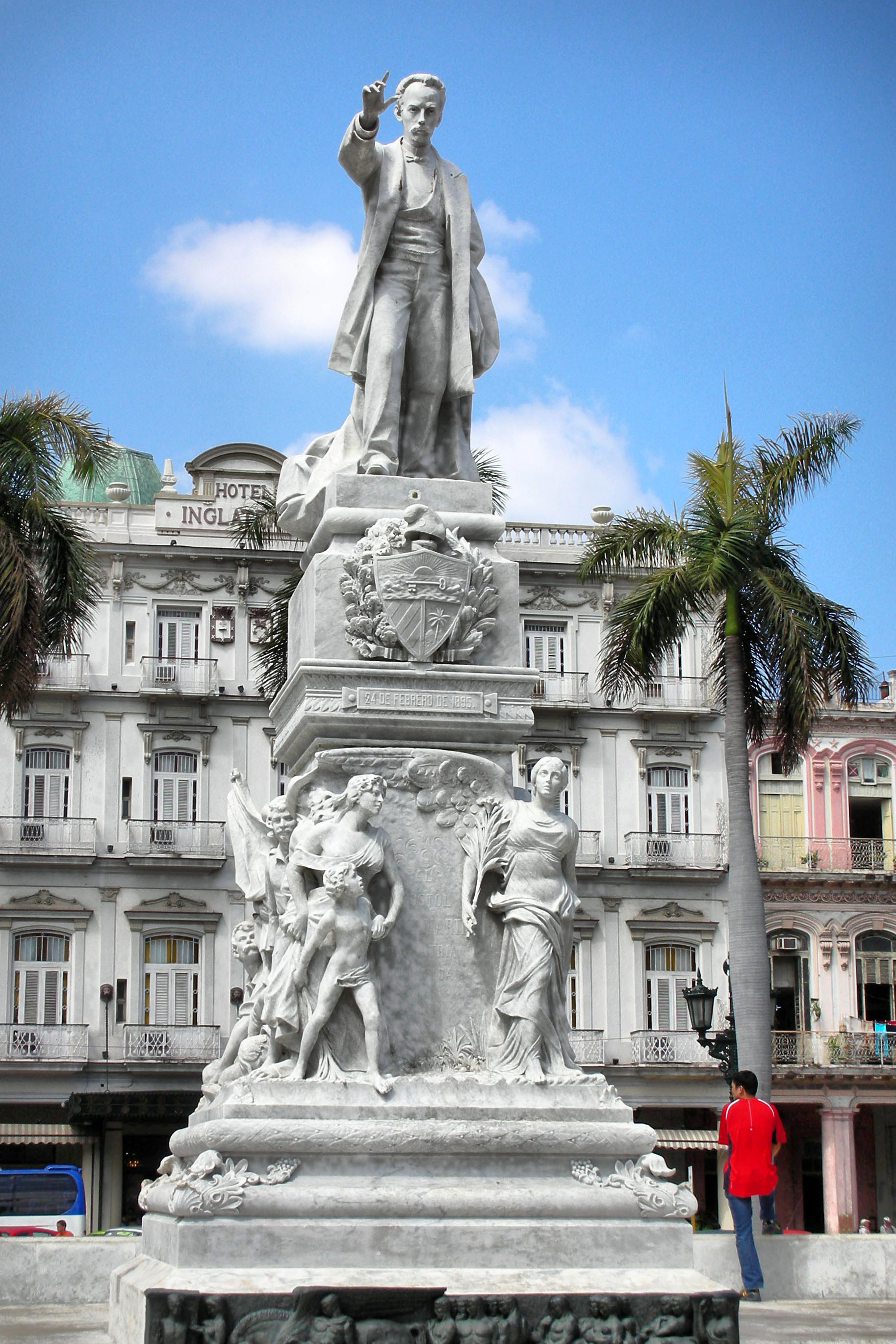
Statue of José Martí in Parque Central, Havana, sculpted by Villalta Saavedra in 1905.

José Villalta Saavedra (born January 27, 1862, Havana, - died March 16, 1912, Rome) was a Cuban sculptor. One of the first native Cuban sculptors, Villalta was a mulatto born in Havana. Thanks to private patrons, he was able to train in Europe, first in Canarias (Spain) and then in la Reale Accademia di Belle Arti di Carrara. He worked in Italy and Cienfuegos.

== Works ==
Villalta created several important Cuban monuments and statues, including the statue of José Marti located in Havana's Parque Central (Central Park) (dedicated February 24, 1905) and the monument to Cuban engineer Francisco de Albear. Villalta completed the Albear statue in Florence, Italy in 1893. The sculptor won a national competition to create a memorial to eight Cuban medical students executed in 1871 by Spanish colonial troops. It was completed in 1889, and it was the first monument made in Cuba by a Cuban artist.

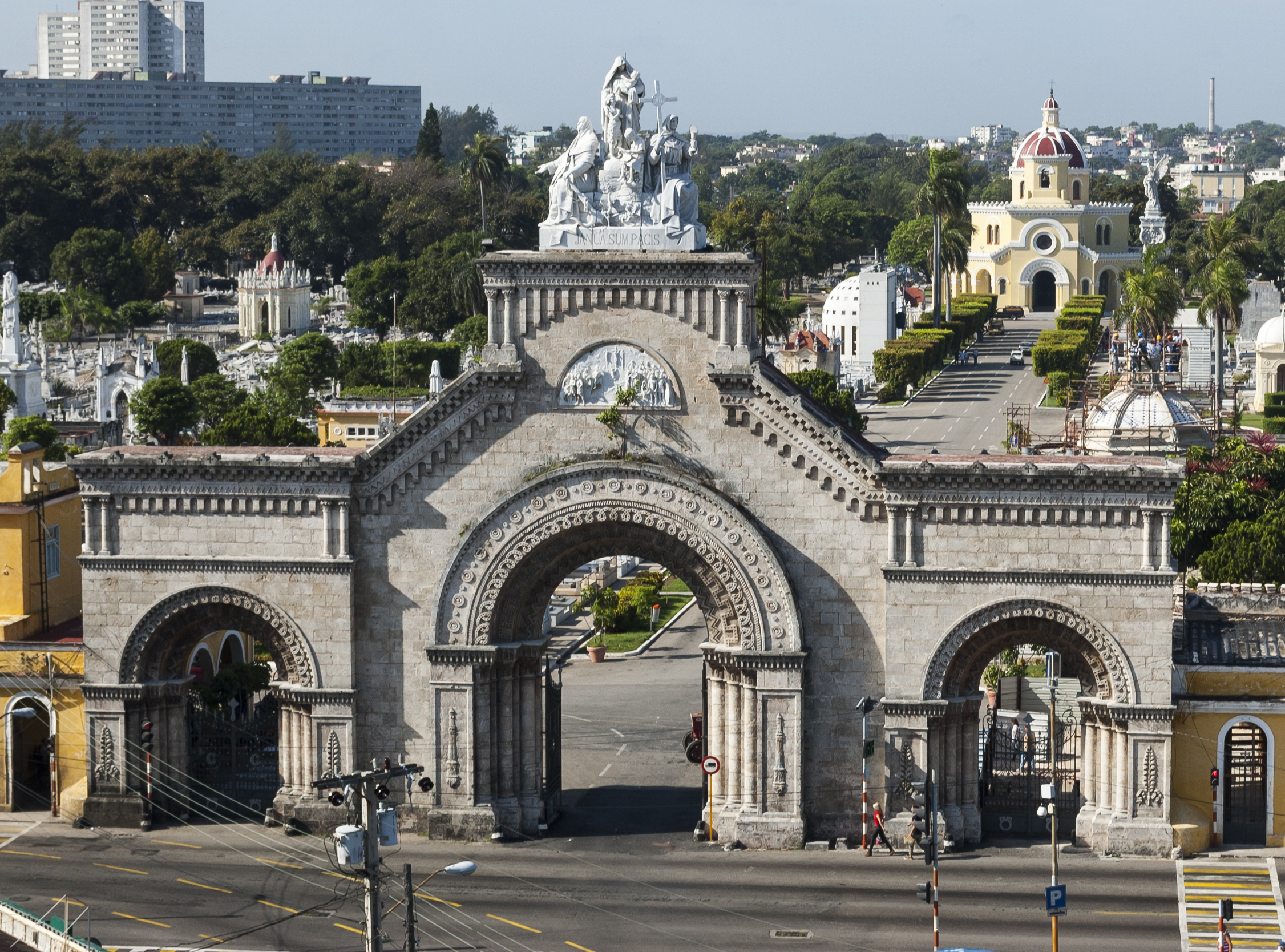
The main gate of Colon Cemetery in Havana. The Virtues atop the gate were sculpted by Villalta.

In Havana's Necropolis Cristobal Colon (Christopher Columbus Cemetery), Villalta made the sculptures of the Virtues (Faith, Hope and Charity) above the main cemetery entrance and the religious relief sculptures around the cemetery walls. Villalta also created the monument at the most visited place in Necropolis Colon, the grave of Amelia Goyri de la Hoz [de Adot], a woman known as "La Milagrosa" ("The Miraculous Woman" or "The Miraculous One"). An upper-class woman, she died in childbirth in 1901 at age 23, and her stillborn son was placed at her feet when she was buried. According to legend, when the grave was opened years later, her corpse was intact – a sign of holiness – and her son was nestled in her arms. Amelia is considered by many to be Cuba's unofficial saint. Cubans come to her grave every day to ask for children or love affairs. Villalta carved the sculpture out of one piece of Carrara marble, and he finished the work in 1902.

In his last years, he made the marble monument of Joaquín Albarrán, in Sagua La Grande, in 1910 and the monument dedicated to the martyrs, located in the Martyrs Park, in the city of Cárdenas, Matanzas Province, Cuba. The last one was placed in 1912, shortly after Villalta's death.

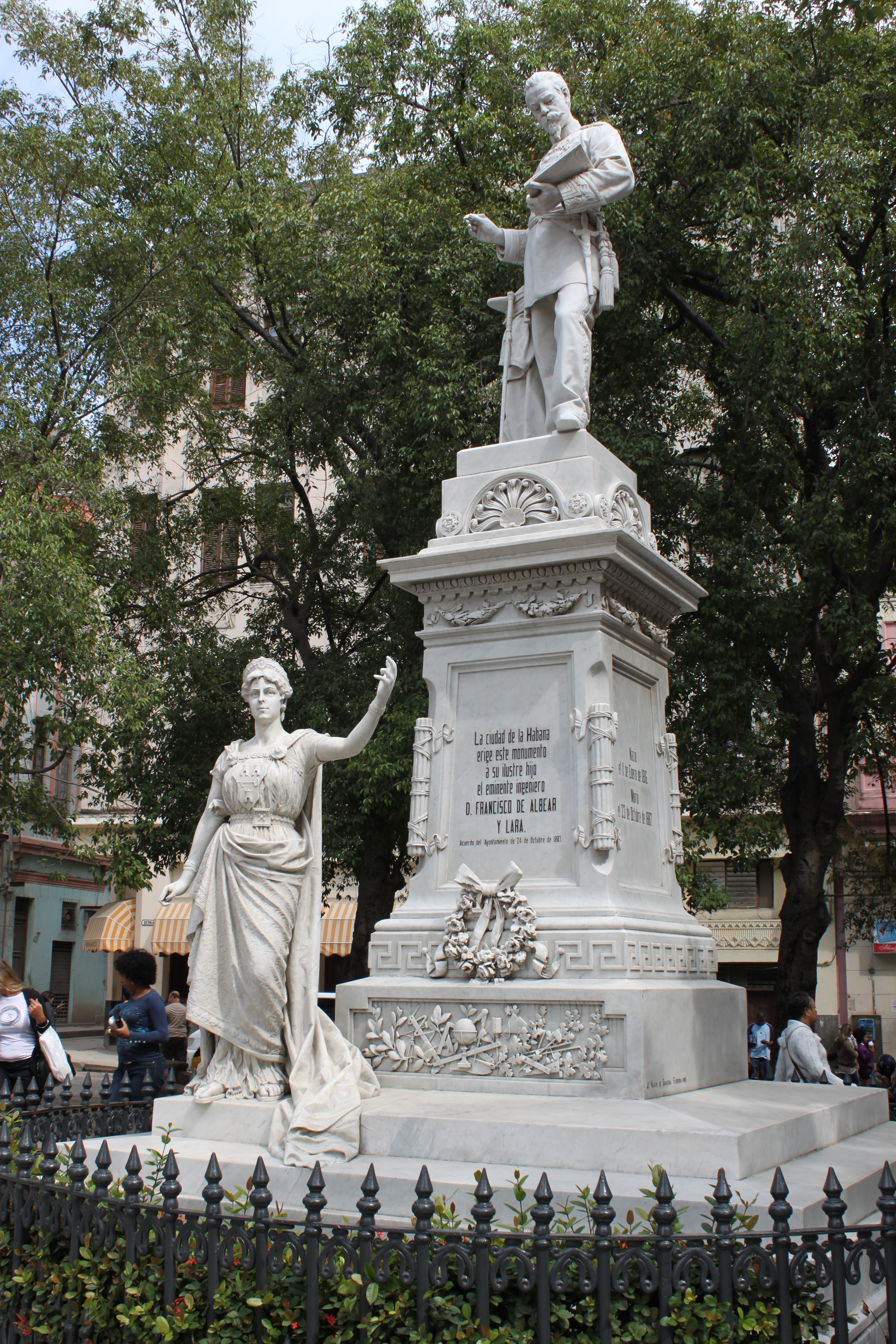
Statue of Francisco de Albear by Cuban sculptor José Villalta Saavedra in Havana
