= Parque Central, Havana =

Park in the city center of Havana

Coordinates: 23°08′15″N 82°21′31″W

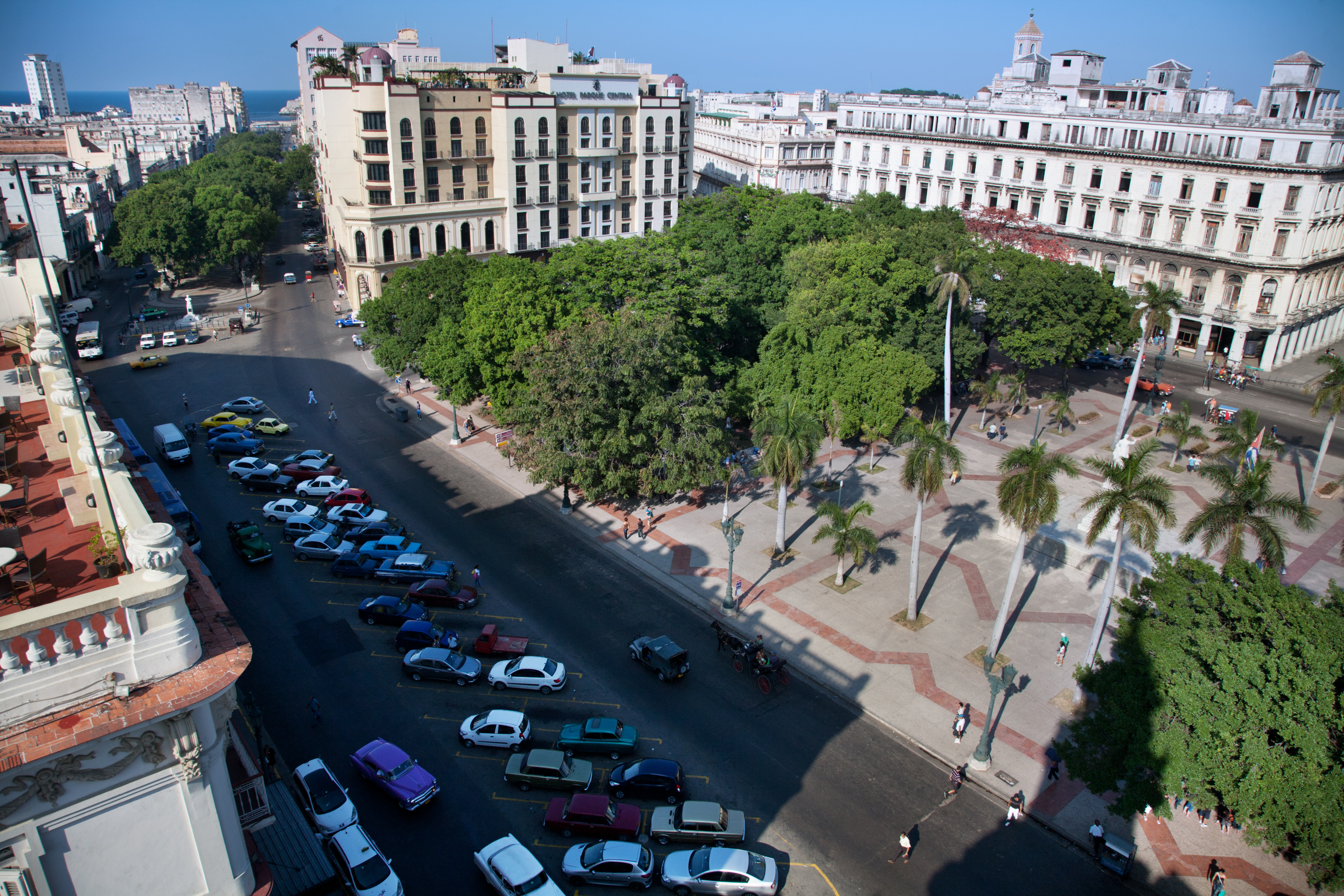
- Interactive map of the Parque Central, Havana area

The Parque Central, Havana is one of the best known and central sites of the city of Havana, Cuba. It is located between Prado, Neptuno, Zulueta and San José streets, and San Rafael Boulevard. Among the buildings surrounding the park are Gran Teatro de La Habana (The Great Theatre of Havana Alicia Alonso), the Hotel Inglaterra (England Hotel), the Hotel Telégrafo, el Hotel Parque Central (Central Park Hotel), la Manzana de Gómez, the Hotel Plaza and Museo Nacional de Bellas Artes.

== Gardens ==
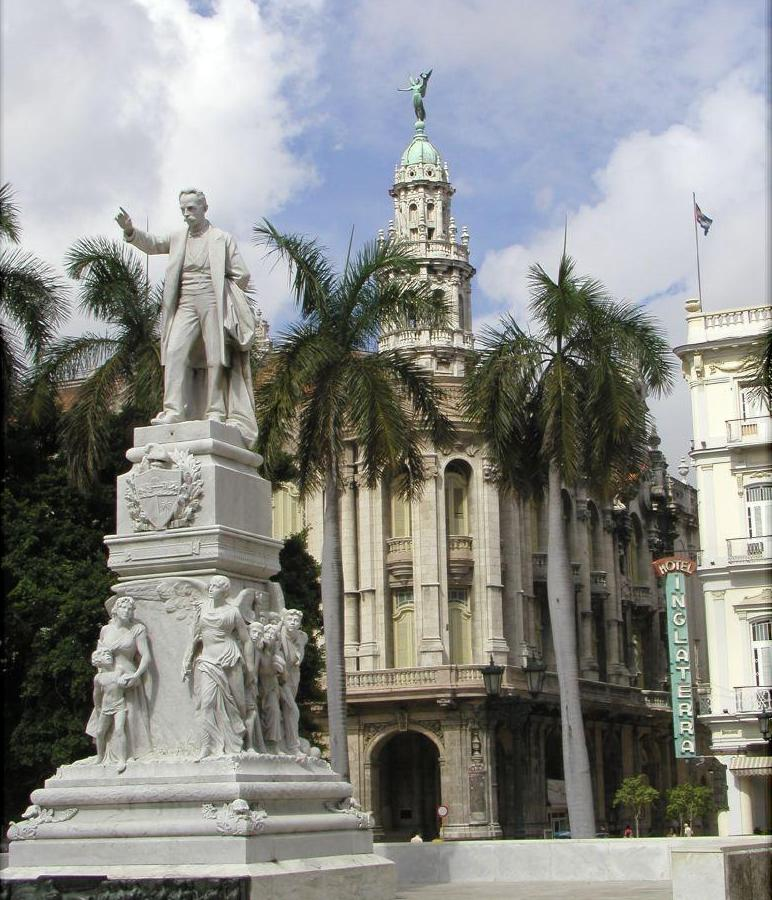
Statue of José Martí

The gardens surrounding the statue of Jose Marti by José Vilalta Saavedra have a series of paths that intersect. There are 28 royal palms that signify Martí's birth date, as well as 8 coffin-shaped stonework, representing medical students shot by the Spanish Government on the Island during the Ten Years' War November 27, 1871.

== Gallery ==
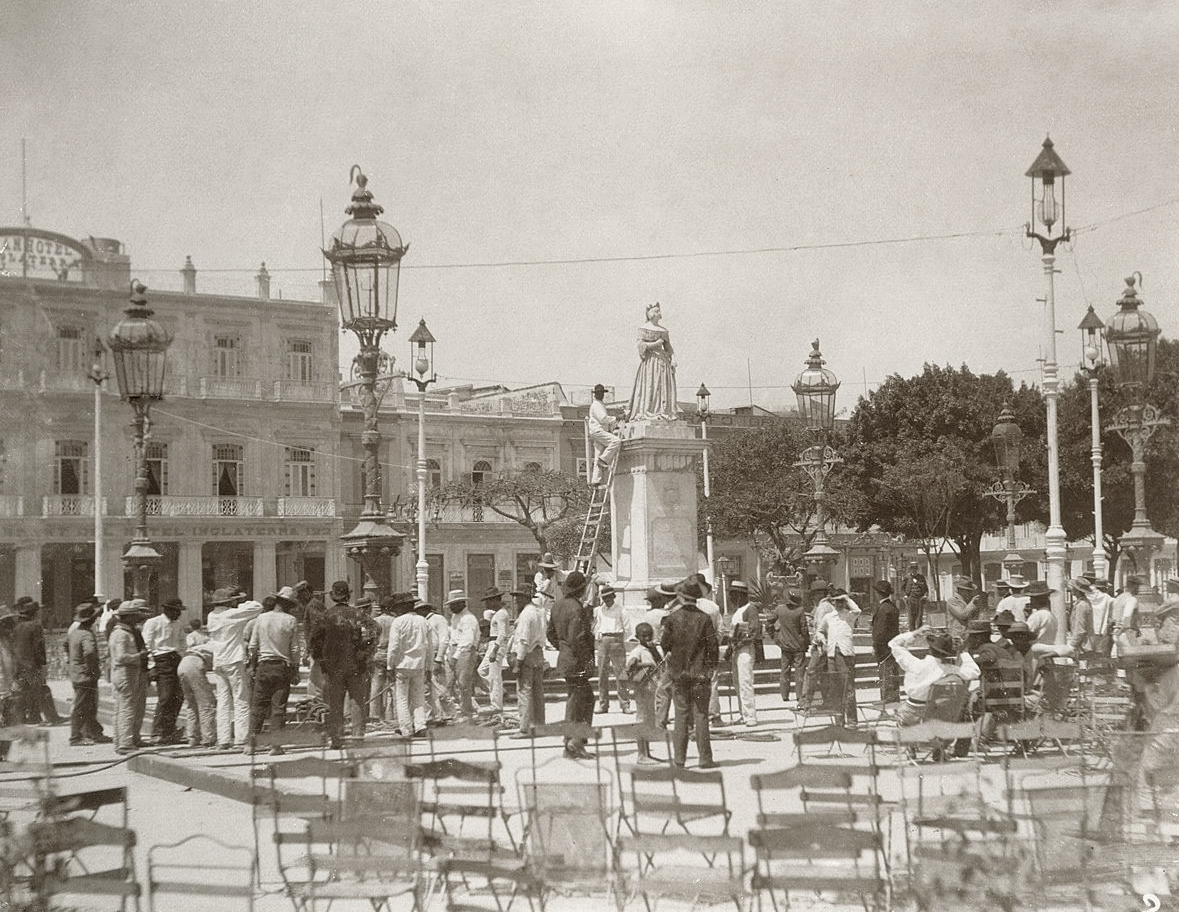
Central Park with Isabel II statue - 1899

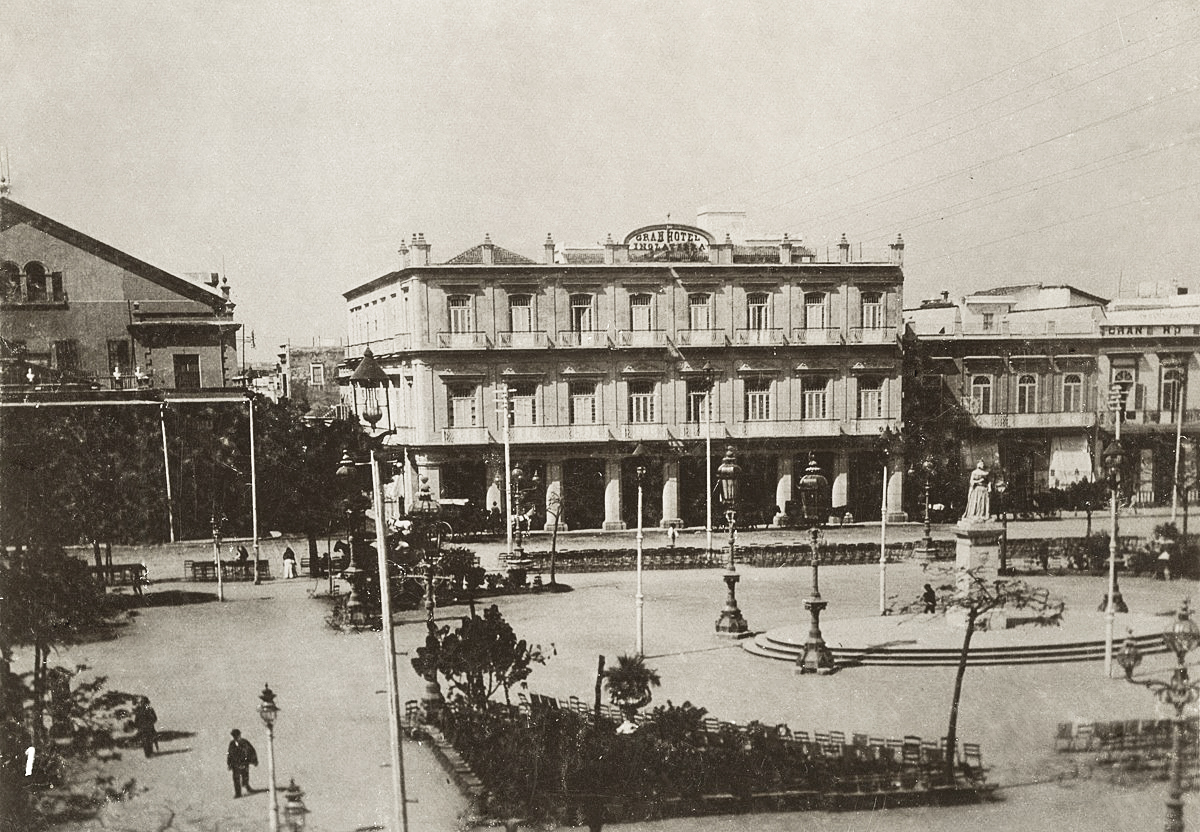
Central Park with Hotel Inglaterra - 1899
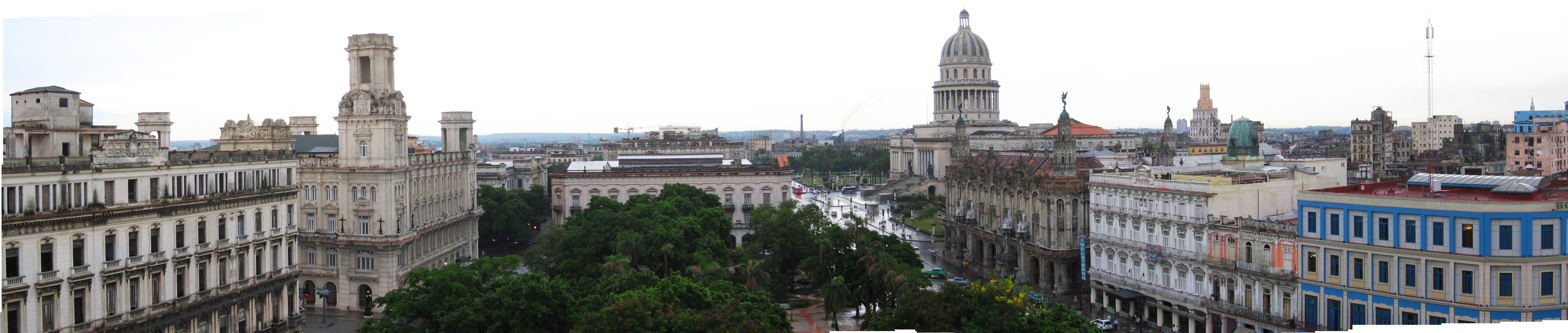
Parque Central

== See also ==
- El Capitolio
- Tacón Theatre
- Gran Teatro de La Habana
- Paseo del Prado, Havana
- Jean-Claude Nicolas Forestier
- José Vilalta Saavedra
- Monument to Columbus (Valladolid), originally intended for the Parque Central
