= Carrer de Balmes, Barcelona =

Avenue in Barcelona, Catalonia, Spain

Coordinates: 41°23′54″N 2°09′03″E

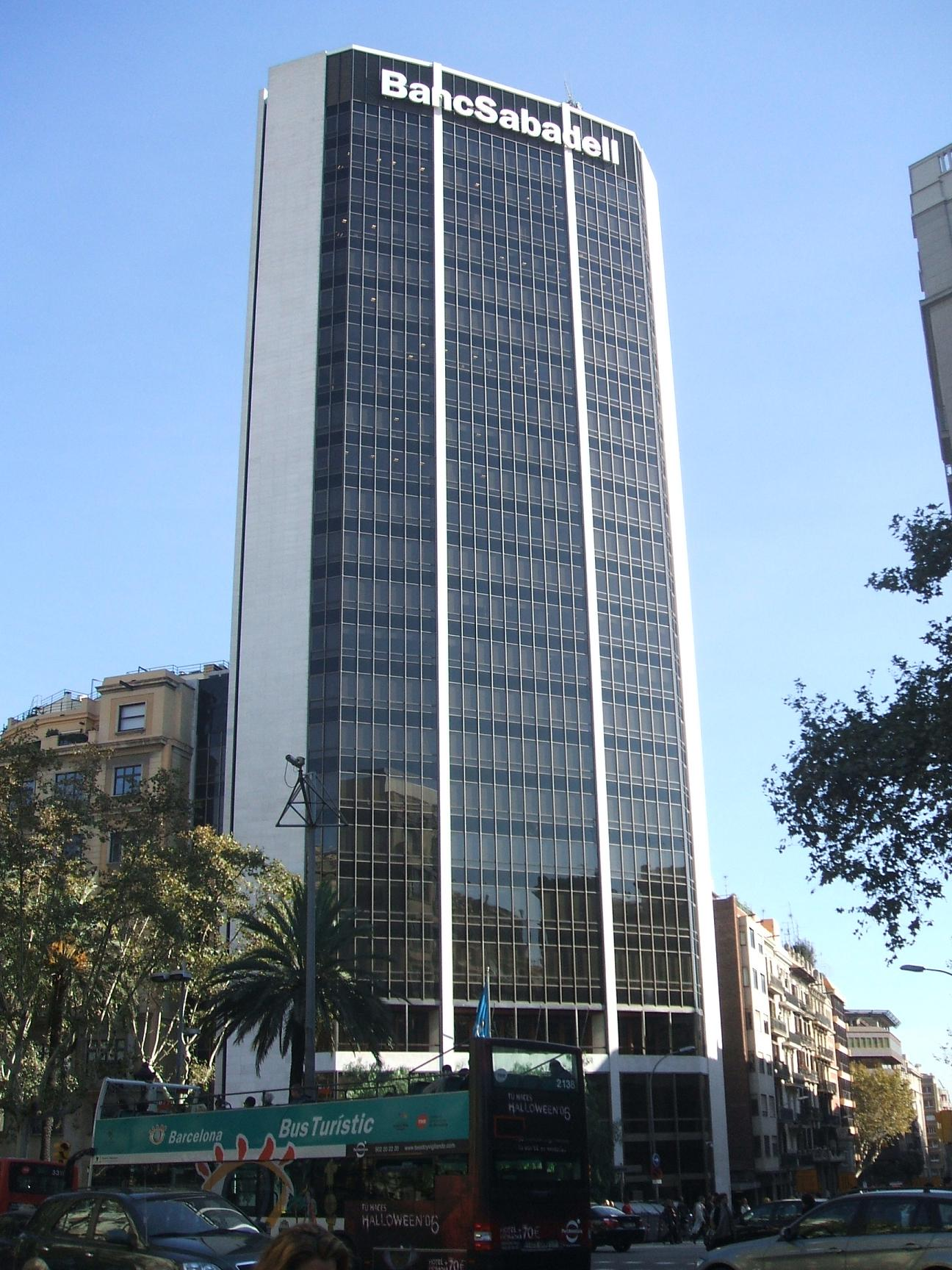
Banc Sabadell headquarters.

Carrer de Balmes (Catalan pronunciation: [kəˈre ðə ˈβalməs]), named after the Catalan philosopher and ecclesiastic Jaume Balmes, is one of the most important avenues in Barcelona (Catalonia, Spain). It was devised in 1859 as part of Ildefons Cerdà urban plan.

Balmes is along Carrer Muntaner the longest road stretching from the sea towards the mountainside. It starts in the crossing of Pelai and Bergara streets and crosses the Eixample and Sant Gervasi districts, ending in Plaça John Fitzgerald Kennedy, by Avinguda del Tibidabo and Tramvia Blau. The Sant Gervasi part of the street was constructed after 1908.

It is considered the central street of Eixample, with Dreta de l'Eixample to its right, and Esquerra de l'Eixample to its left. As with most of the other large streets in the area, it is 20 metres wide, with the difference that its sidewalks are less broad than the average.

The street is expected to come under an extensive reform project in 2009, which will see its five lanes be reduced to four - one of them reserved for buses and taxis like it is today. The pavements on either side will also be enlarged and trees will be planted to make the busy street more pedestrian-friendly.

Carrer de Balmes is also part of the so-called Gaixample, Barcelona's gay village and hosts one of its most famous clubs, Arena.

Banc Sabadell is headquartered at the crossing of Carrer de Balmes with Avinguda Diagonal. Pompeu Fabra University owns a building in this street.

== Architecture ==
- Palauet Pérez Samanillo (1910), by Joan J. Hervás i Arizmendi, hosts Círculo Ecuestre.

== Transportation ==
- Barcelona Metro and Ferrocarrils de la Generalitat de Catalunya (FGC) commuter trains - Provença (L6, L7, L3, L5).

== Notable individuals ==
The writer Mercè Rodoreda was born at number 340 of Carrer de Balmes in 1908.

== Gallery ==
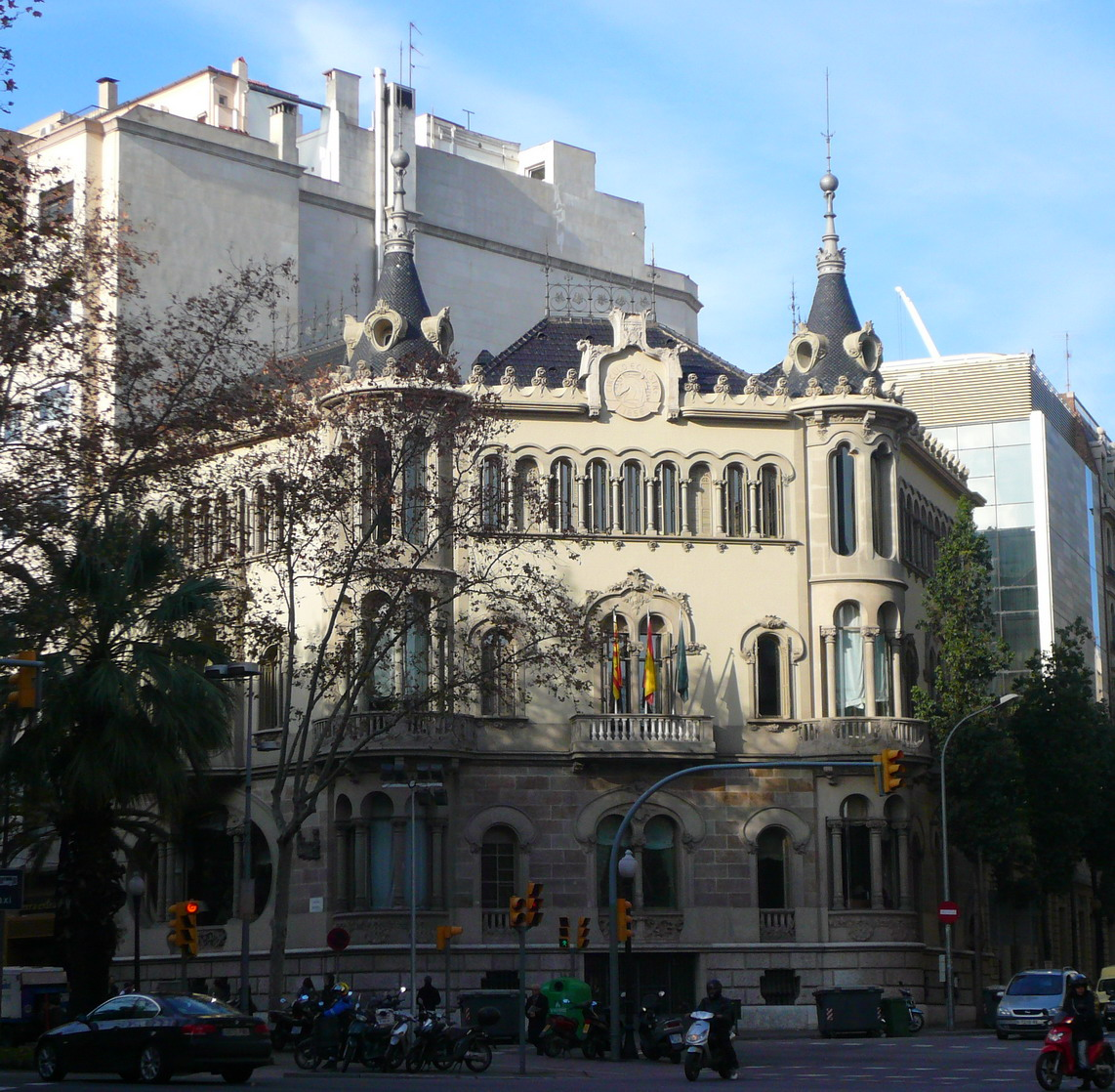
Palauet Pérez Samanillo

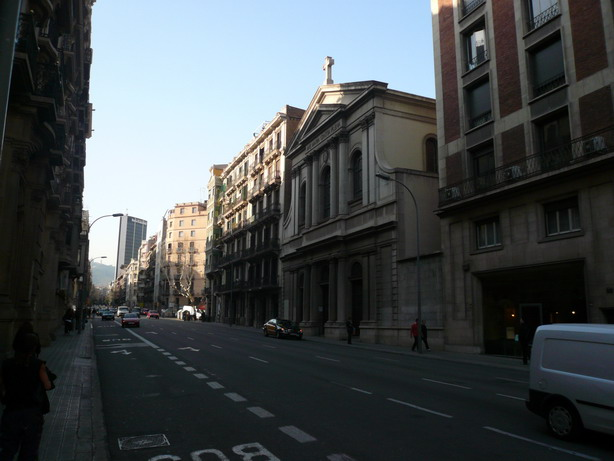
The street between Carrer de Mallorca and Carrer de Provença

== See also ==
- List of streets and squares in Eixample
- Avinguda de la Llum
