= Loquillo =

Loquillo may refer to:

- Loquillo (singer), rock singer from Spain
- Loquillo (chief), Taino Cacique (Chief) of the area of Luquillo (named after him) located in the northeastern coast of Puerto Rico
- Loquillo National Forest, now El Yunque National Forest, Puerto Rico
