= Gaixample =

Neighborhood in Barcelona

Coordinates: 41.385913°N 2.160563°E

The Gaixample, a portmanteau of gai (Catalan for 'gay') and eixample (Catalan for 'extension'), (pronounced [ɡəˈʃamplə]) is the nickname of a central area in Barcelona's Eixample district where, since the end of the 20th century, many gay shops, bars, discos and restaurants have existed. Many LGBT people have settled in this area of the Catalan capital, making it a mecca for LGBT tourists, mainly at night-time.

The Gaixample is bordered by the following streets: Carrer de Balmes, Gran Via de les Corts Catalanes, Carrer del Comte d'Urgell and Carrer d'Aragó. Carrer Diputació between the streets of Aribau and Villarroel has a greater density of gay businesses. Rainbow flags can be seen sometimes in this area.

Several gay-friendly hotels operate in the area.

== See also ==
- Eixample
- Barcelona
- Catalonia
- Gay village
- List of gay villages
- Gay tourism
