= 2015 Barcelona municipal election =

Election in the Spanish municipality of Barcelona

- 24 May 2015

All 41 seats in the City Council of Barcelona 21 seats needed for a majority
- Opinion polls
- Registered: 1,161,140 ▼0.2%
- Turnout: 703,590 (60.6%) ▲7.6 pp
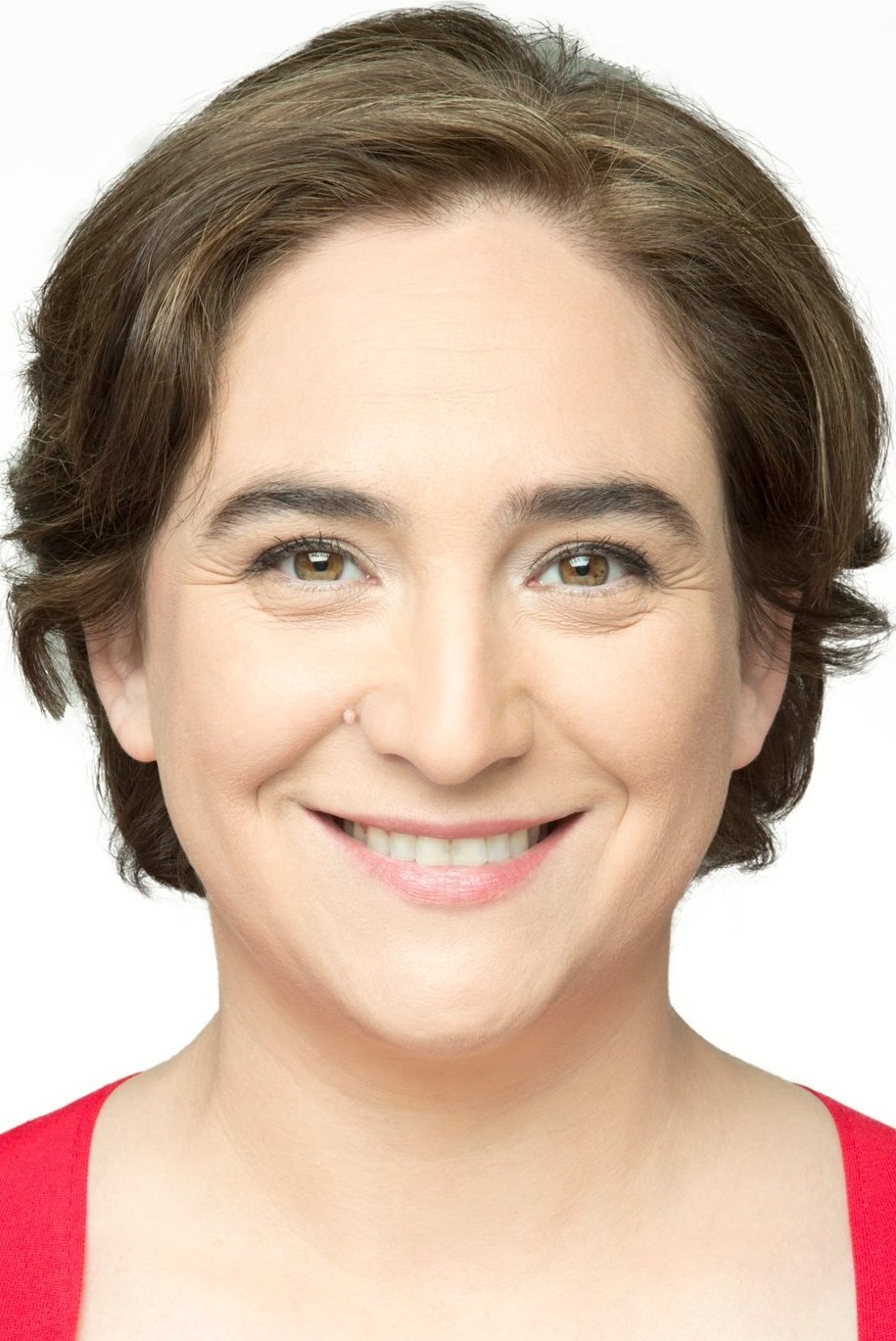

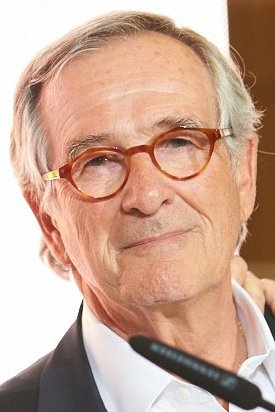

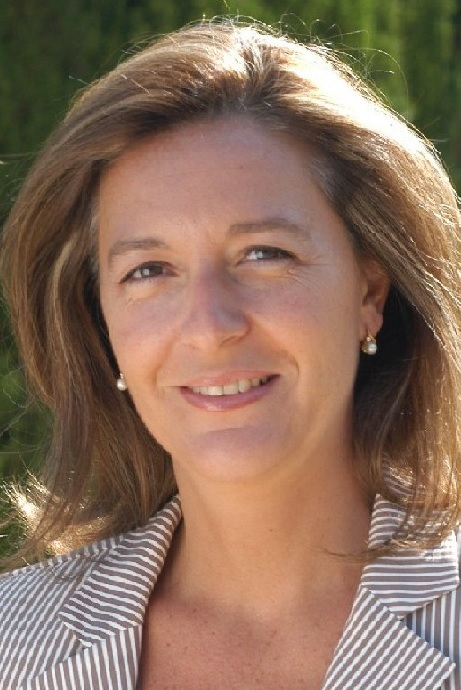

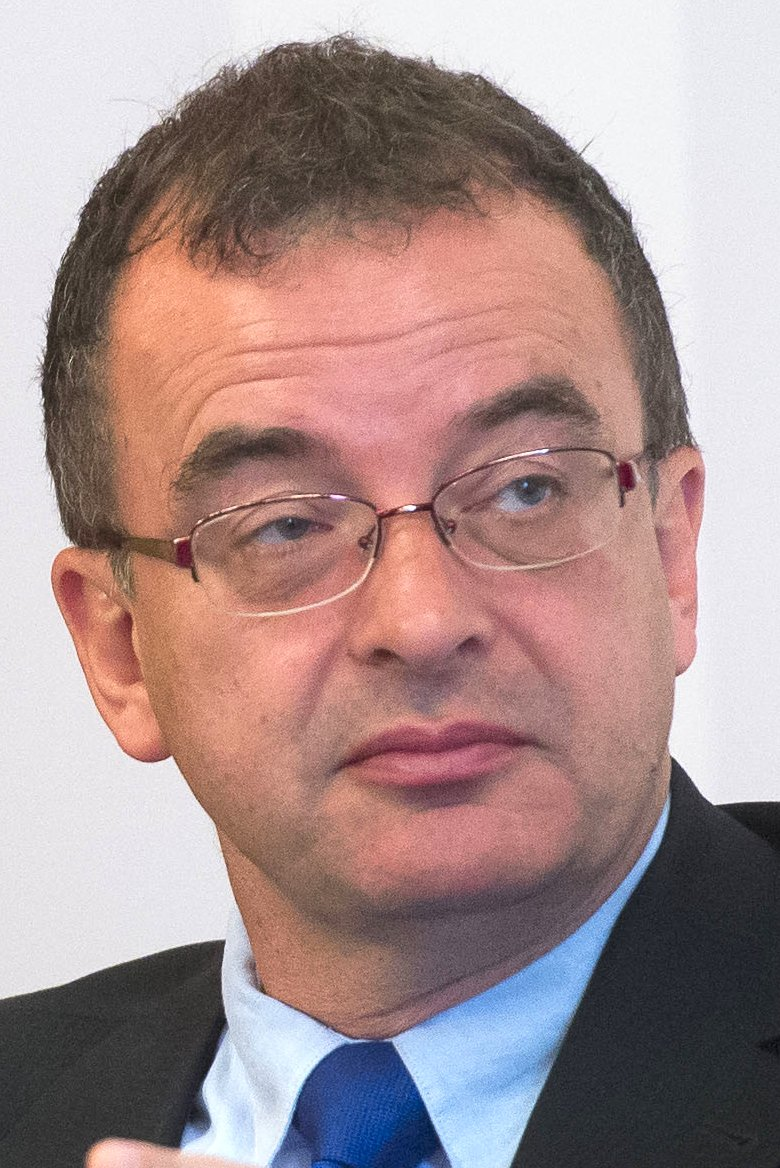

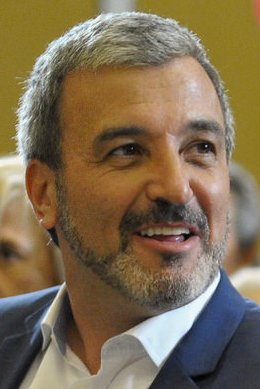

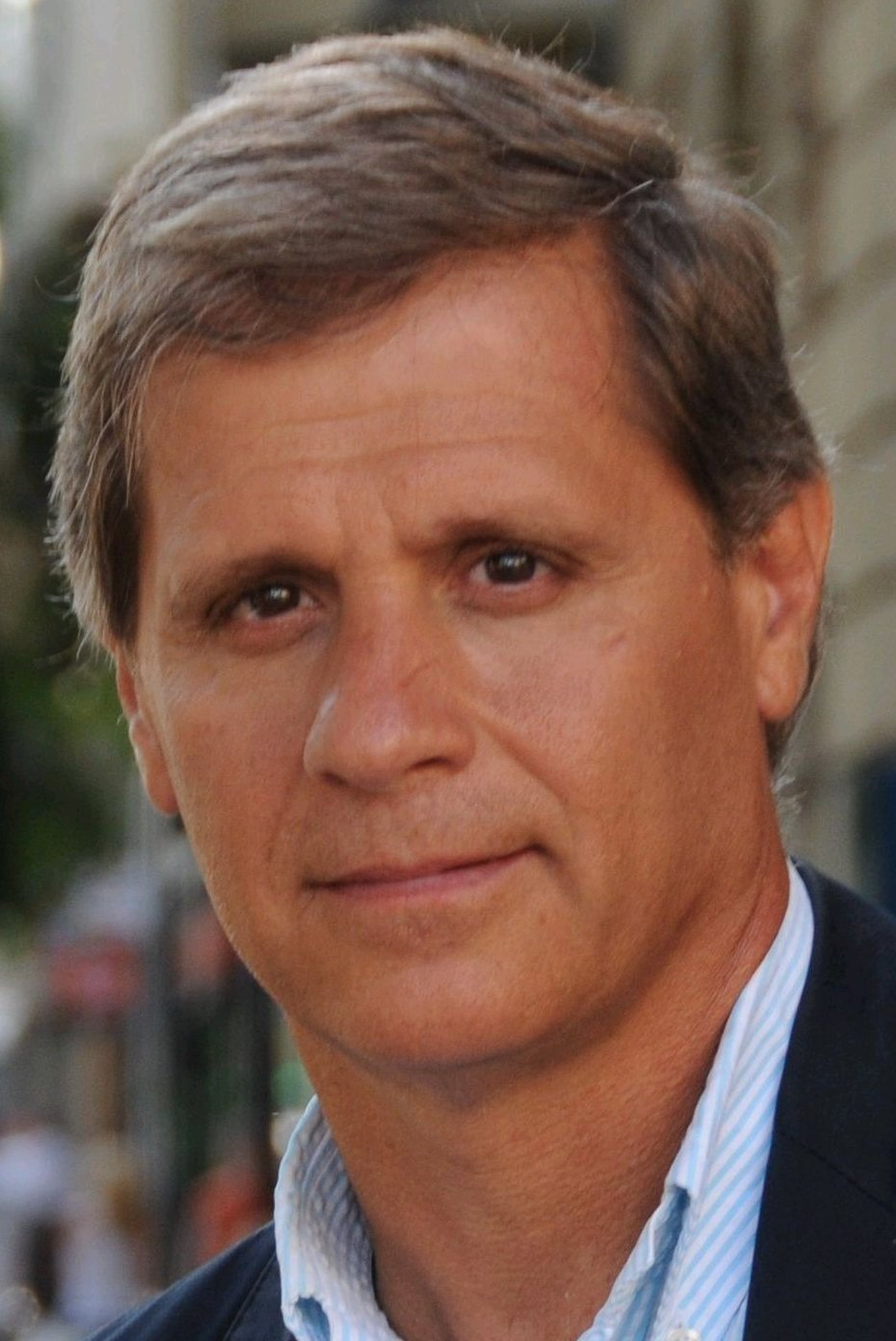
	First party	Second party	Third party
Leader	Ada Colau	Xavier Trias	Carina Mejías
Party	BComú–E	CiU	C's
Leader since	14 March 2015	17 May 2002	16 December 2014
Last election	5 seats, 10.4% (Note: Results for ICV–EUiA–E in the 2011 election.)	14 seats, 28.7%	0 seats, 1.9%
Seats won	11	10	5
Seat change	▲6	▼4	▲5
Popular vote	176,612	159,393	77,272
Percentage	25.2%	22.8%	11.0%
Swing	▲14.8 pp	▼5.9 pp	▲9.1 pp
	Fourth party	Fifth party	Sixth party
Leader	Alfred Bosch	Jaume Collboni	Alberto Fernández Díaz
Party	ERC–MES–BcnCO–A–AM	PSC–CP	PP
Leader since	11 July 2014	5 May 2014	17 July 2002
Last election	2 seats, 5.6%	11 seats, 22.1%	9 seats, 17.2%
Seats won	5	4	3
Seat change	▲3	▼7	▼6
Popular vote	77,120	67,489	61,004
Percentage	11.0%	9.6%	8.7%
Swing	▲5.4 pp	▼12.5 pp	▼8.5 pp
Mayor before election
Xavier Trias
CiU
Mayor after election
Ada Colau
BComú

A municipal election was held in Barcelona on 24 May 2015 to elect the 10th City Council of the municipality. All 41 seats in the City Council were up for election. It was held concurrently with regional elections in thirteen autonomous communities and local elections all across Spain.

The election was won by the Barcelona en Comú (BComú) citizen platform, supported by Podemos, Initiative for Catalonia Greens–United and Alternative Left (ICV–EUiA) and Constituent Process (Procés Constituent) and led by Ada Colau popular activist and former spokeswoman of the Platform for People Affected by Mortgages (PAH). Incumbent mayor Xavier Trias of the Convergence and Union (CiU) federation, who had campaigned for a second consecutive term in office, saw his support reduced from 14 to 10 out of 41 seats in the council. Citizens (C's) became the third largest political force in the city, whereas Republican Left of Catalonia (ERC) obtained its second best historical result. On the other hand, both the Socialists' Party of Catalonia (PSC) and the People's Party (PP) were severely mauled. The PSC, which had won every municipal election in Barcelona and had controlled the local government up until 2011, fell to fifth place and below 10% of the share, while the PP achieved its worst result since the People's Alliance (AP) result in the 1987 election. The Popular Unity Candidacy (CUP) also entered the City Council for the first time in history, winning 3 seats and 7.4% of the votes.

Colau went on to become the first female mayor of Barcelona in history with the support of the BComú, ERC, the PSC and one of the CUP councillors.

== Overview ==
Under the 1978 Constitution, the governance of municipalities in Spain—part of the country's local government system—was centered on the figure of city councils (Spanish: ayuntamientos), local corporations with independent legal personality composed of a mayor, a government council and an elected legislative assembly. The mayor was indirectly elected by the local assembly, requiring an absolute majority; otherwise, the candidate from the most-voted party automatically became mayor (ties were resolved by drawing lots). In the case of Barcelona, the top-tier administrative and governing body was the City Council of Barcelona.

=== Date ===
The term of local assemblies in Spain expired four years after the date of their previous election, with election day being fixed for the fourth Sunday of May every four years. The election decree was required to be issued no later than 54 days before the scheduled election date and published on the following day in the Official State Gazette (BOE). The previous local elections were held on 22 May 2011, setting the date for election day on the fourth Sunday of May four years later, which was 24 May 2015.

Local assemblies could not be dissolved before the expiration of their term, except in cases of mismanagement that seriously harmed the public interest and implied a breach of constitutional obligations, in which case the Council of Ministers could—optionally—decide to call a by-election.

Elections to the assemblies of local entities were officially called on 31 March 2015 with the publication of the corresponding decree in the BOE, setting election day for 24 May.

=== Electoral system ===
Voting for local assemblies was based on universal suffrage, comprising all Spanish nationals over 18 years of age, registered and residing in the municipality and with full political rights (provided that they had not been deprived of the right to vote by a final sentence, nor were legally incapacitated), as well as resident non-national European citizens, and those whose country of origin allowed reciprocal voting by virtue of a treaty.

Local councillors were elected using the D'Hondt method and closed-list proportional voting, with a five percent-threshold of valid votes (including blank ballots) in each municipality. Each municipality was a multi-member constituency, with a number of seats based on the following scale:

Population	Councillors
<100	3
101–250	5
251–1,000	7
1,001–2,000	9
2,001–5,000	11
5,001–10,000	13
10,001–20,000	17
20,001–50,000	21
50,001–100,000	25
>100,001	+1 per each 100,000 inhabitants or fraction +1 if total is an even number

The law did not provide for by-elections to fill vacant seats; instead, any vacancies arising after the proclamation of candidates and during the legislative term were filled by the next candidates on the party lists or, when required, by designated substitutes.

== Parties and candidates ==
The electoral law allowed for parties and federations registered in the interior ministry, alliances and groupings of electors to present lists of candidates. Parties and federations intending to form an alliance were required to inform the relevant electoral commission within 10 days of the election call, whereas groupings of electors needed to secure the signature of a determined amount of the electors registered in the municipality for which they sought election, disallowing electors from signing for more than one list. In the case of Barcelona, as its population was over 1,000,001, at least 8,000 signatures were required. Additionally, a balanced composition of men and women was required in the electoral lists, so that candidates of either sex made up at least 40 percent of the total composition.

Below is a list of the main parties and alliances which contested the election:

Candidacy	Parties and alliances	Leading candidate	Ideology	Previous result		Gov.	Ref.
Candidacy	Parties and alliances	Leading candidate	Ideology	Vote %	Seats	Gov.	Ref.
CiU	List: Convergence and Union (CiU) – Democratic Convergence of Catalonia (CDC) – Democratic Union of Catalonia (UDC)	Xavier Trias	Catalan nationalism Centrism	28.7%	14	Yes	
PSC–CP	List: Socialists' Party of Catalonia (PSC–PSOE)	Jaume Collboni	Social democracy	22.1%	11	No	
PP	List: People's Party (PP)	Alberto Fernández Díaz	Conservatism; Christian democracy	17.2%	9	No	
BComú–E	List: Barcelona in Common (BComú); We Can (Podem); Initiative for Catalonia Greens (ICV); United and Alternative Left (EUiA) – Communists of Catalonia (Comunistes.Cat) – Living Unified Socialist Party of Catalonia (PSUC viu) – The Dawn Marxist Organization (La Aurora (OM)); Equo (Equo); Constituent Process (Procés Constituent)	Ada Colau	Left-wing populism Participatory democracy	10.4%	5	No	
ERC–MES– BcnCO–A–AM	List: Republican Left of Catalonia (ERC); Left Movement (MES); Advance (Avancem)	Alfred Bosch	Catalan independence Left-wing nationalism Social democracy	5.6%	2	No	
CUP– Capgirem–PA	List: Popular Unity Candidacy (CUP) – Forward–Socialist Organization of National Liberation (Endavant–OSAN) – Free People (PL–PPCC) – Internationalist Struggle (LI–CI) – In Struggle (EL) – Red Current (CR); Let's Reverse (Capgirem)	María José Lecha	Catalan independence Anti-capitalism; Socialism	2.0%	0	No	
C's	List: Citizens–Party of the Citizenry (C's)	Carina Mejías	Liberalism	1.9%	0	No	

== Opinion polls ==
The tables below list opinion polling results in reverse chronological order, showing the most recent first and using the dates when the survey fieldwork was done, as opposed to the date of publication. Where the fieldwork dates are unknown, the date of publication is given instead. The highest percentage figure in each polling survey is displayed with its background shaded in the leading party's colour. If a tie ensues, this is applied to the figures with the highest percentages. The "Lead" column on the right shows the percentage-point difference between the parties with the highest percentages in a poll.

=== Voting intention estimates ===
The table below lists weighted voting intention estimates. Refusals are generally excluded from the party vote percentages, while question wording and the treatment of "don't know" responses and those not intending to vote may vary between polling organisations. When available, seat projections determined by the polling organisations are displayed below (or in place of) the percentages in a smaller font; 21 seats were required for an absolute majority in the City Council of Barcelona.

Color key:

Poll conducted after legal ban on opinion polls Exit poll

Polling firm/Commissioner	Fieldwork date	Sample size	Turnout	CiU	PSC	PP	ICV–EUiA	ERC	CUP	C's	Podemos	BComú	Lead
2015 municipal election	24 May 2015	—N/a	60.6	22.8; 10	9.6; 4	8.7; 3	(Note: Within BComú.)	11.0; 5	7.4; 3	11.0; 5		25.2; 11	2.4
TNS Demoscopia/RTVE–FORTA	24 May 2015	?	?	21.3; 9/11	11.0; 4/5	10.1; 4/5		9.6; 3/4	8.8; 3/4	10.2; 4/5		23.6; 10/12	2.3
GESOP/El Periòdic	21–23 May 2015	1,100	?	24.4; 10/11	12.3; 5	10.4; 4/5		9.0; 4	6.2; 2/3	9.9; 4		24.0; 10/11	0.4
GESOP/El Periòdic	20–22 May 2015	1,000	?	24.6; 10/11	11.9; 5	11.5; 5		9.1; 4	6.2; 2/3	8.6; 3/4		23.5; 10/11	1.1
GAD3/Antena 3	11–22 May 2015	?	?	? 11/12	? 5/6	? 4/5		? 3/4	? 2	? 3/4		? 10/11	?
GESOP/El Periòdic	19–21 May 2015	800	?	24.5; 10/11	11.9; 5	11.5; 5		9.5; 4	6.2; 2/3	9.5; 4		22.0; 9/10	2.5
GESOP/El Periòdic	19–20 May 2015	700	?	24.5; 11	11.2; 5	11.5; 5		10.0; 4/5	5.6; 2	10.3; 4/5		21.4; 9/10	3.1
GESOP/El Periòdic	18–19 May 2015	600	?	23.7; 11	11.7; 5	11.9; 5		10.3; 4/5	5.6; 2	10.9; 4/5		20.5; 9/10	3.2
GESOP/El Periòdic	17–18 May 2015	400	?	23.0; 10/11	11.7; 5/6	11.9; 5/6		10.5; 4/5	5.0; 0/2	11.5; 5/6		21.0; 9/10	2.0
Metroscopia/El País	8–13 May 2015	1,000	65	22.0; 10	8.2; 3	5.1; 2		12.0; 5	8.3; 3	13.9; 6		27.0; 12	5.0
MyWord/Cadena SER	6–13 May 2015	800	?	22.3; 10/11	11.0; 5	8.4; 4		10.7; 4/5	7.0; 3	13.3; 6		20.3; 9/10	2.0
JM&A/Público	12 May 2015	?	?	? 10	? 5	? 4		? 5	? 2	? 7		? 8	?
Encuestamos	1–12 May 2015	?	?	21.3; 9/10	12.8; 5/6	9.9; 3/4		12.0; 4/5	–	14.7; 6/7		24.1; 10/11	2.7
Sigma Dos/El Mundo	8–11 May 2015	800	?	22.7; 10/11	13.0; 6	10.6; 4/5		9.8; 4	5.1; 0/2	13.6; 6		20.6; 9	2.1
GESOP/El Periódico	7–8 May 2015	800	?	22.6; 10/11	14.6; 6/7	12.5; 5/6		10.2; 4/5	5.0; 0/2	12.1; 5/6		18.9; 8/9	3.7
GAD3/ABC	20 Apr–4 May 2015	508	?	23.9; 11/12	11.1; 5/6	10.2; 4/5		11.5; 5/6	4.3; 0	15.3; 6/7		17.5; 8/9	6.4
JM&A/Público	3 May 2015	?	?	21.7; 10	11.5; 5	9.8; 4		10.2; 4	5.4; 2	13.6; 6		21.1; 10	0.6
Feedback/La Vanguardia	24–28 Apr 2015	700	?	24.2; 10/11	13.5; 5/6	11.1; 4/5		11.4; 5	5.4; 2	14.2; 6		17.1; 7	7.1
CIS	23 Mar–19 Apr 2015	993	?	18.5; 8	11.6; 5	9.1; 4		10.1; 4	7.1; 3	13.8; 6		25.9; 11	7.4
Sigma Dos/El Mundo	24–25 Mar 2015	800	?	21.4; 9/10	13.2; 5/6	10.3; 4		12.5; 5/6	2.7; 0	14.6; 6/7		22.3; 10	0.9
M2015	6 Mar 2015	530	?	20.5; 9	13.4; 6	13.2; 6		16.1; 7	5.8; 2	7.8; 3		18.1; 8	2.4
8TV	21 Feb 2015	?	?	23.2; 11	19.0; 9	10.6; 5		8.4; 4	2.1; 0	6.3; 3		19.0; 9	4.2
Feedback/La Vanguardia	16–19 Feb 2015	700	55.1	25.3; 11/12	10.7; 5	13.7; 6		10.3; 4/5	4.2; 0/2	8.1; 3		21.4; 10	3.9
Llorente & Cuenca	31 Oct 2014	?	?	? 10/12	? 8/10	? 6/7		? 4/5	? 1/2	–		? 3/5	?
GESOP/El Periódico	15–18 Jul 2014	800	?	22.3; 10/11	13.0; 6	14.0; 6/7	7.9; 3/4	14.2; 7/8	? 0	6.3; 2/3	? 0	7.6; 3/4	8.1
2014 EP election	25 May 2014	—N/a	51.0	20.9 (10)	12.2 (6)	12.0 (6)	12.6 (6)	21.8 (10)	–	7.0 (3)	4.7 (0)	–	0.9
Feedback/La Vanguardia	14–17 Oct 2013	800	56.7	24.9; 11	12.9; 6	14.7; 6	13.3; 6	14.8; 6	5.8; 2	8.5; 4	–	–	10.1
GESOP/El Periódico	13–15 May 2013	800	?	24.1; 11/12	14.2; 6/7	12.0; 5/6	14.2; 6/7	10.2; 4/5	9.0; 4	9.2; 4	–	–	9.9
2012 regional election	25 Nov 2012	—N/a	70.9	29.4 (14)	12.2 (5)	14.9 (7)	12.0 (5)	13.1 (6)	4.0 (0)	8.2 (4)	–	–	14.5
GESOP/El Periódico	4–7 Jun 2012	800	?	27.5; 14	20.0; 10	13.3; 7	12.2; 6	8.0; 4	–	–	–	–	7.5
2011 general election	20 Nov 2011	—N/a	68.1	27.7 (12)	25.7 (12)	21.3 (10)	10.0 (4)	7.2 (3)	–	–	–	–	2.0
2011 municipal election	22 May 2011	—N/a	53.0	28.7; 14	22.1; 11	17.2; 9	10.4; 5	5.6; 2	2.0; 0	1.9; 0	–	–	6.6

=== Voting preferences ===
The table below lists raw, unweighted voting preferences.

Color key:

Poll conducted after legal ban on opinion polls

Polling firm/Commissioner	Fieldwork date	Sample size	CiU	PSC	PP	ICV–EUiA	ERC	CUP	C's	Podemos	BComú	Question	X mark	Lead
2015 municipal election	24 May 2015	—N/a	13.7	5.8	5.3		6.6	4.5	6.7		15.2	—N/a	39.4	1.5
GESOP/El Periòdic	21–23 May 2015	1,100	22.9	8.5	2.6		8.9	5.9	5.2		20.7	19.1	3.8	2.2
GESOP/El Periòdic	20–22 May 2015	1,000	23.0	7.1	3.1		9.0	5.7	5.2		21.0	19.4	3.4	2.0
GESOP/El Periòdic	19–21 May 2015	800	24.1	6.8	3.3		8.3	6.4	6.0		19.5	18.5	3.9	4.6
GESOP/El Periòdic	19–20 May 2015	700	22.1	5.6	4.0		9.4	5.4	7.0		19.0	18.5	4.6	3.1
GESOP/El Periòdic	18–19 May 2015	600	21.0	6.3	4.0		9.7	5.0	7.5		17.7	19.4	5.2	3.3
GESOP/El Periòdic	17–18 May 2015	400	18.8	6.0	3.8		10.3	3.0	7.3		20.3	20.8	5.3	1.5
Metroscopia/El País	8–13 May 2015	1,000	13.6	5.3	3.3		7.8	6.0	9.0		17.5	32.4	2.8	3.9
MyWord/Cadena SER	6–13 May 2015	800	11.3	3.5	2.6		13.3	7.1	8.9		15.4	25.9	6.4	2.1
GESOP/El Periódico	7–8 May 2015	800	18.1	6.9	2.3		10.6	5.5	7.3		16.1	25.7	4.0	2.0
CIS	23 Mar–19 Apr 2015	993	12.3	4.6	2.4		7.5	4.2	5.1		13.5	39.0	8.8	1.2
GESOP/El Periódico	15–18 Jul 2014	800	16.3	7.3	3.6	6.3	18.5	1.6	3.3	2.9	6.1	22.4	5.5	2.2
IEP–DEP/City Council	25 Jun–8 Jul 2014	800	11.1	2.6	1.2	5.5	11.1	1.4	1.5	2.2	–	40.5	17.5	Tie
2014 EP election (Note: Does not include non-resident citizens.)	25 May 2014	—N/a	10.6	6.2	6.1	6.4	11.0	–	3.5	2.4	–	—N/a	49.0	0.4
IEP–DEP/City Council	26 Nov–4 Dec 2013	800	13.7	5.1	1.6	6.9	7.5	3.3	1.9	–	–	37.1	16.8	6.2
IEP–DEP/City Council	11–17 Jun 2013	800	18.0	6.1	2.1	6.6	10.0	0.9	1.5	–	–	31.2	18.6	8.0
GESOP/El Periódico	13–15 May 2013	800	17.9	6.6	2.4	9.0	9.4	4.4	3.3	–	–	25.7	10.4	8.5
Apolda/City Council	14–20 Dec 2012	800	14.4	4.7	1.7	7.9	10.6	4.2	1.6	–	–	34.7	14.5	3.8
2012 regional election	25 Nov 2012	—N/a	20.7	8.6	10.5	8.4	9.2	2.8	5.8	–	–	—N/a	29.1	10.2
Apolda/City Council	13–20 Jun 2012	800	19.3	8.7	1.9	7.9	5.7	–	–	–	–	28.8	19.6	10.6
GESOP/El Periódico	4–7 Jun 2012	800	22.0	9.1	3.4	7.3	5.1	–	–	–	–	27.3	12.9	12.9
Apolda/City Council	12–19 Dec 2011	800	23.6	9.1	3.4	8.6	6.8	–	–	–	–	28.2	12.3	14.5
2011 general election	20 Nov 2011	—N/a	18.6	17.3	14.3	6.7	4.8	–	–	–	–	—N/a	31.9	1.3
2011 municipal election	22 May 2011	—N/a	15.0	11.5	9.0	5.4	2.9	1.0	1.0	–	–	—N/a	47.0	3.5

=== Victory preferences ===
The table below lists opinion polling on the victory preferences for each party in the event of a municipal election taking place.

Polling firm/Commissioner	Fieldwork date	Sample size	CiU	PSC	PP	ICV–EUiA	ERC	CUP	C's	BComú	Other/ None	Question	Lead
CIS	23 Mar–19 Apr 2015	993	14.2	7.8	3.8		11.2	4.7	9.0	17.3	8.2	23.8	3.1
Feedback/La Vanguardia	14–17 Oct 2013	800	19.6	10.0	2.6	7.3	19.4	3.0	2.7	–	35.4		0.2

=== Victory likelihood ===
The table below lists opinion polling on the perceived likelihood of victory for each party in the event of a municipal election taking place.

Polling firm/Commissioner	Fieldwork date	Sample size	CiU	PSC	PP	ERC	CUP	C's	BComú	Other/ None	Question	Lead
CIS	23 Mar–19 Apr 2015	993	33.2	5.0	2.6	9.2	0.1	1.1	6.1	2.0	40.6	24.0

=== Preferred Mayor ===
The table below lists opinion polling on leader preferences to become mayor of Barcelona.

Color key:

Poll conducted after legal ban on opinion polls

Polling firm/Commissioner	Fieldwork date	Sample size											Other/ None/ Not care	Question	Lead
Polling firm/Commissioner	Fieldwork date	Sample size	Trias CiU	Martí PSC	Collboni PSC	F. Díaz PP	Gomà ICV–EUiA	Portabella ERC	Bosch ERC	Lecha CUP	Mejías C's	Colau BComú	Other/ None/ Not care	Question	Lead
GESOP/El Periòdic	21–23 May 2015	1,100	26.9	–	6.1	2.4	–	–	8.4	4.6	3.0	25.3	7.5	15.9	1.6
GESOP/El Periòdic	20–22 May 2015	1,000	27.0	–	4.9	3.3	–	–	8.6	4.1	2.8	24.5	8.2	16.6	2.5
GESOP/El Periòdic	19–21 May 2015	800	27.5	–	4.5	3.6	–	–	8.3	4.5	3.3	22.6	8.3	17.6	4.9
GESOP/El Periòdic	19–20 May 2015	700	25.3	–	4.4	4.3	–	–	9.4	3.6	3.9	22.1	8.1	18.8	3.2
GESOP/El Periòdic	18–19 May 2015	600	25.3	–	4.2	4.0	–	–	8.3	3.2	4.2	22.2	8.5	20.2	3.1
GESOP/El Periòdic	17–18 May 2015	400	24.5	–	4.3	3.5	–	–	8.5	1.8	4.0	24.5	9.0	20.1	Tie
Metroscopia/El País	8–13 May 2015	1,000	27.0	–	4.0	4.0	–	–	7.0	2.0	2.0	27.0	27.0		Tie
GESOP/El Periódico	7–8 May 2015	800	28.3	–	4.1	4.1	–	–	9.3	2.4	1.8	23.4	9.8	17.0	4.9
GAD3/ABC	20 Apr–4 May 2015	508	23.2	–	2.8	1.7	–	–	7.1	–	7.9	14.0	18.2	25.1	9.2
Feedback/La Vanguardia	24–28 Apr 2015	700	29.3	–	5.0	5.3	–	–	9.8	3.8	0.3	25.2	4.2	17.1	4.1
Feedback/La Vanguardia	16–19 Feb 2015	700	30.0	–	3.2	4.6	–	–	9.1	–	0.6	25.3	5.6	21.6	4.7
Feedback/La Vanguardia	14–17 Oct 2013	800	30.7	3.8	–	4.9	4.6	22.7	–	–	–	–	33.3		8.0

== Results ==
← Summary of the 24 May 2015 City Council of Barcelona election results →
Parties and alliances	Popular vote			Seats	
Parties and alliances	Votes	%	±pp	Total	+/−
Barcelona in Common (Let's Win Barcelona)–Agreement (BComú–E)^{1}	176,612	25.21	+14.82	11	+6
Convergence and Union (CiU)	159,393	22.75	−5.98	10	−4
Citizens–Party of the Citizenry (C's)	77,272	11.03	+9.09	5	+5
ERC–MES–Barcelona Open City–Advance–AM (ERC–MES–BcnCO–A–AM)	77,120	11.01	+5.42	5	+3
Socialists' Party of Catalonia–Progress Candidacy (PSC–CP)	67,489	9.63	−12.51	4	−7
People's Party (PP)	61,004	8.71	−8.53	3	−6
Popular Unity Candidacy–Let's Reverse Barcelona (CUP–Capgirem–PA)	51,945	7.42	+5.47	3	+3
Animalist Party Against Mistreatment of Animals (PACMA)	5,720	0.82	+0.11	0	±0
The Greens–The Ecologist Alternative (EV–AE)	5,684	0.81	New	0	±0
Better Barcelona (RI.cat–SI)^{2}	2,626	0.37	−0.76	0	±0
Blank Seats (EB)	1,957	0.28	−1.39	0	±0
Platform for Catalonia (PxC)	1,617	0.23	−0.34	0	±0
Vox–Family and Life Party (Vox–PFiV)^{3}	1,520	0.22	+0.13	0	±0
United Free Citizens (CILUS)	989	0.14	New	0	±0
Union, Progress and Democracy (UPyD)	811	0.12	−0.12	0	±0
Communist Party of the Catalan People (PCPC)	656	0.09	−0.07	0	±0
Spanish Phalanx of the CNSO (FE de las JONS)	455	0.07	+0.01	0	±0
Humanist Party (PH)	439	0.06	−0.04	0	±0
United for Declaring Catalan Independence (UPDIC)	286	0.04	New	0	±0
Libertarian Party (P–LIB)	273	0.04	New	0	±0
Internationalist Solidarity and Self-Management (SAIn)	166	0.02	−0.02	0	±0
The National Coalition (LCN)	99	0.01	New	0	±0
Blank ballots	6,363	0.91	−3.56		
Total	700,496			41	±0
Valid votes	700,496	99.56	+1.26		
Invalid votes	3,094	0.44	−1.26		
Votes cast / turnout	703,590	60.59	+7.60		
Abstentions	457,550	39.41	−7.60		
Registered voters	1,161,140				
Sources
Footnotes: ^{1} Barcelona in Common (Let's Win Barcelona)–Agreement results are compared to Initiative for Catalonia Greens–EUiA–Agreement totals in the 2011 election.; ^{2} Better Barcelona results are compared to Catalan Solidarity for Independence totals in the 2011 election.; ^{3} Vox–Family and Life Party results are compared to Family and Life Party totals in the 2011 election.

Popular vote
BComú–E	25.21%
CiU	22.75%
C's	11.03%
ERC–BcnCO–AM	11.01%
PSC–CP	9.63%
PP	8.71%
CUP–Capgirem	7.42%
Others	3.33%
Blank ballots	0.91%

Seats
BComú–Entesa	26.83%
CiU	24.39%
C's	12.20%
ERC–BcnCO–AM	12.20%
PSC–CP	9.76%
PP	7.32%
CUP–Capgirem	7.32%

== Aftermath ==
=== Government formation ===
Investiture
Ballot →	13 June 2015	
Required majority →	21 out of 41	
Ada Colau (BComú): • BComú (11); • ERC (5); • PSC (4); • CUP (1)	21 / 41	check
Xavier Trias (CiU): • CiU (10)	10 / 41	X mark
Carina Mejías (C's): • C's (5)	5 / 41	X mark
Alberto Fernández Díaz (PP): • PP (3)	3 / 41	X mark
Abstentions/Blank ballots: • CUP (2)	2 / 41	
Absentees	0 / 41	

== Bibliography ==
- Constitución Española (Constitution). Official State Gazette (in Spanish). 27 December 1978 [version as of 27 September 2011]. BOE-A-1978-31229.
- Ley 7/1985, de 2 de abril, Reguladora de las Bases del Régimen Local (Law 7/1985). Official State Gazette (in Spanish). 2 April 1985 [version as of 30 December 2013]. BOE-A-1985-5392.
- Ley Orgánica 5/1985, de 19 de junio, del Régimen Electoral General (Organic Law 5/1985). Official State Gazette (in Spanish). 19 June 1985 [version as of 31 March 2015]. BOE-A-1985-11672.
- Real Decreto 233/2015, de 30 de marzo, por el que se convocan elecciones locales y a las Asambleas de Ceuta y Melilla para el 24 de mayo de 2015 (Royal Decree 233/2015). Official State Gazette (in Spanish). 30 March 2015. BOE-A-2015-3448.
