= 2027 Barcelona municipal election =

Election in the Spanish municipality of Barcelona

- 23 May 2027

All 43 (Note: Seat total has been manually calculated by applying the electoral rules set out in the law, on the basis of the latest official population figures provided by the Spanish government as of 2026. As such, it should be deemed as a provisional, non-binding estimation. The definitive allocation will be determined by the election decree at the time of the parliament's dissolution. The City Council size was set at 41 seats for the previous election.) seats in the City Council of Barcelona 22 seats needed for a majority
- Opinion polls
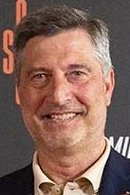

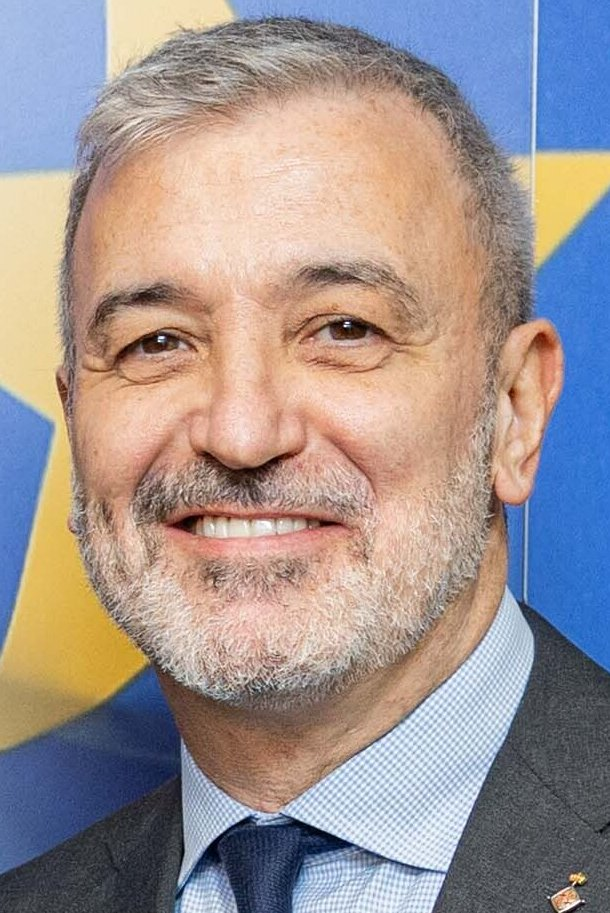

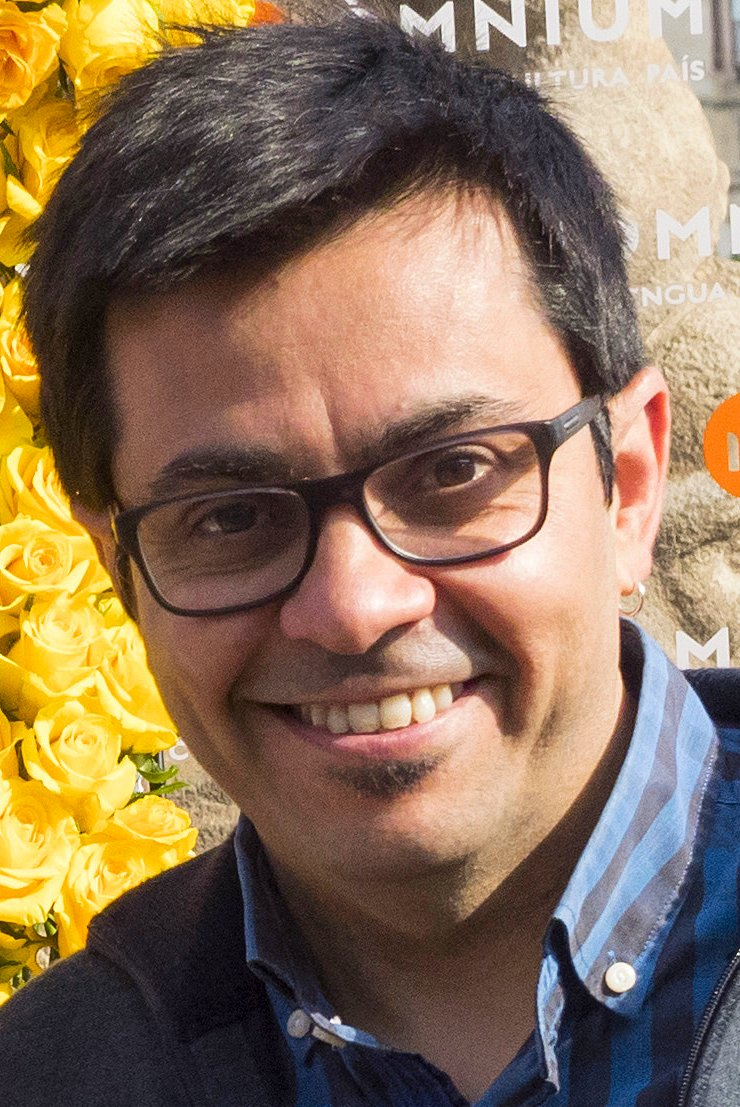

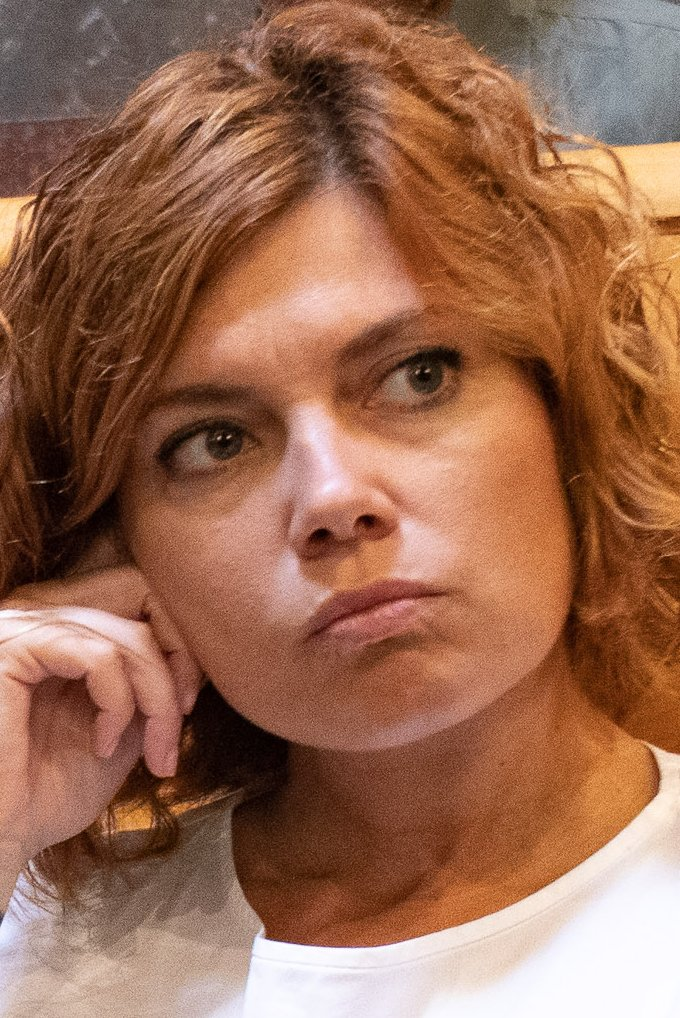

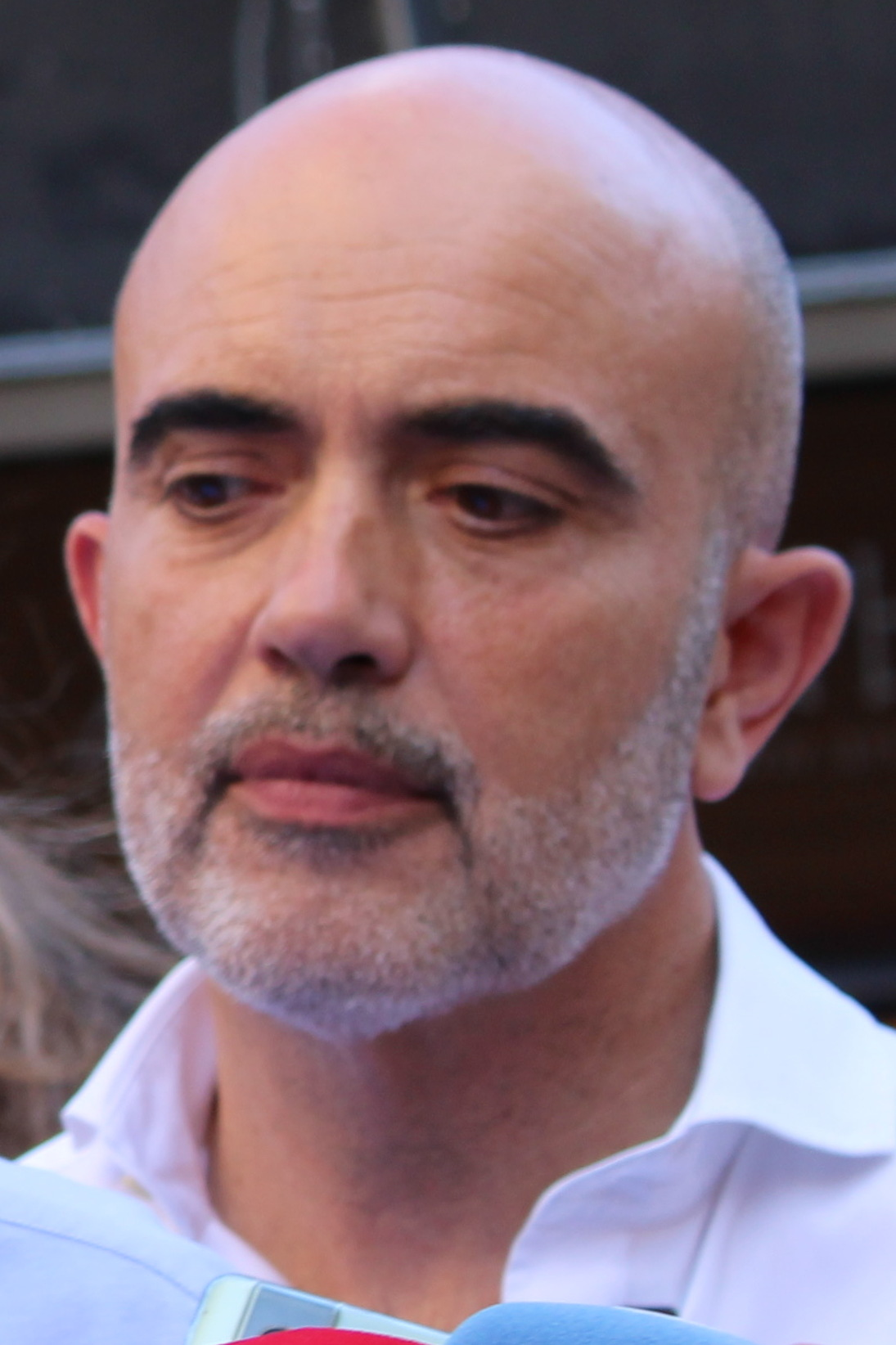

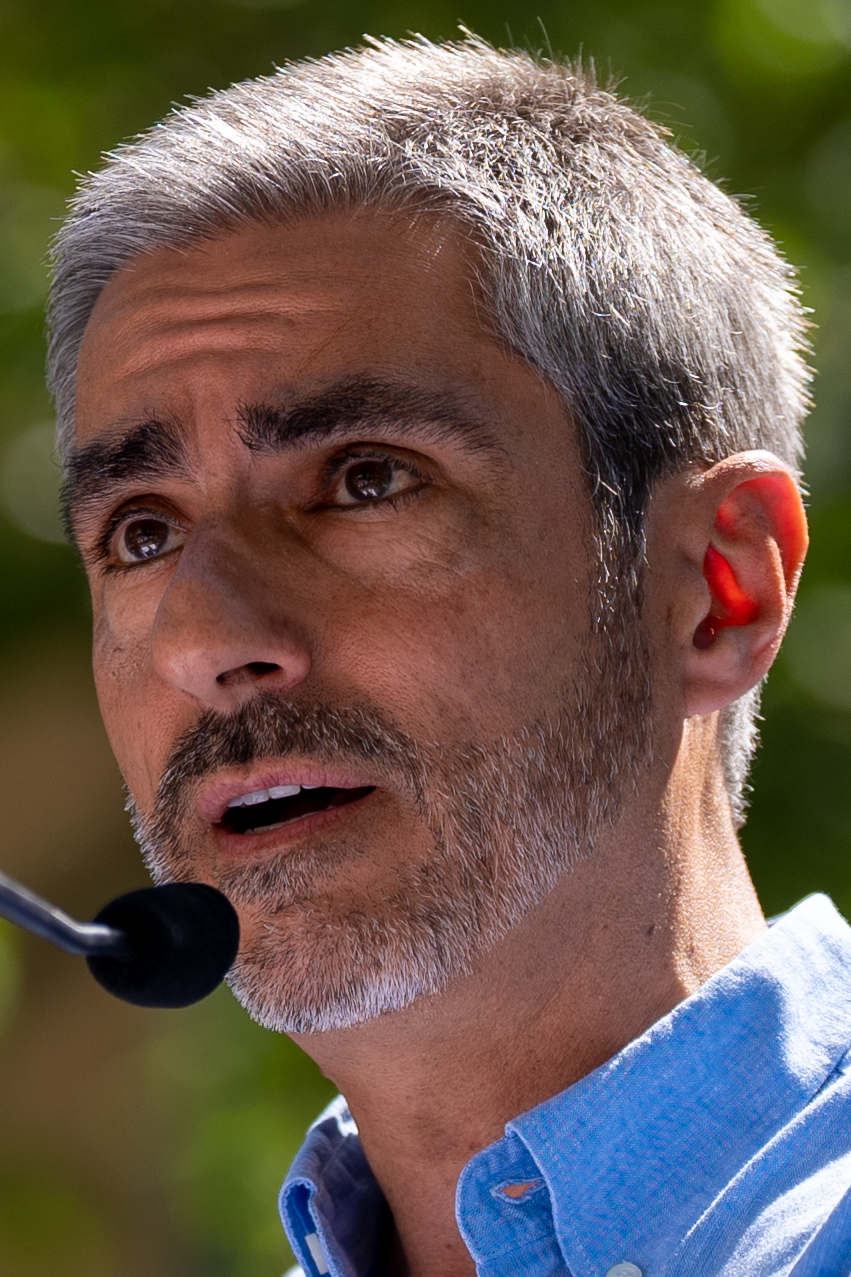
Leader	Jordi Martí	Jaume Collboni	Gerardo Pisarello
Party	Junts	PSC–CP	BComú–C
Leader since	6 September 2024	5 May 2014	20 February 2026
Last election	11 seats, 22.5%	10 seats, 19.8%	9 seats, 19.8%
Current seats	11	10	9
Seats needed	▲10	▲11	▲12
Leader	Elisenda Alamany	Daniel Sirera	Gonzalo de Oro
Party	ERC–AM	PP	Vox
Leader since	22 December 2023	9 January 2023	5 January 2023
Last election	5 seats, 11.2%	4 seats, 9.2%	2 seats, 5.7%
Current seats	5	4	2
Seats needed	▲16	▲17	▲19
Incumbent Mayor
Jaume Collboni
PSC

A municipal election will be held in Barcelona on 23 May 2027 to elect the 13th City Council of the municipality of Barcelona. All 43 seats in the City Council will be up for election. It will be held concurrently with regional elections in at least seven autonomous communities and local elections all across Spain.

== Overview ==
Under the 1978 Constitution, the governance of municipalities in Spain—part of the country's local government system—is centered on the figure of city councils (Spanish: ayuntamientos), local corporations with independent legal personality composed of a mayor, a government council and an elected legislative assembly. The mayor is indirectly elected by the local assembly, requiring an absolute majority; otherwise, the candidate from the most-voted party automatically becomes mayor (ties are resolved by drawing lots). In the case of Barcelona, the top-tier administrative and governing body is the City Council of Barcelona.

=== Date ===
The term of local assemblies in Spain expires four years after the date of their previous election, with election day being fixed for the fourth Sunday of May every four years (as of 2026, this has been the year before a leap year). The election decree shall be issued no later than 54 days before the scheduled election date and published on the following day in the Official State Gazette (BOE). The previous local elections were held on 28 May 2023, setting the date for election day on the fourth Sunday of May four years later, which is 23 May 2027.

Local assemblies can not be dissolved before the expiration of their term, except in cases of mismanagement that seriously harm the public interest and imply a breach of constitutional obligations, in which case the Council of Ministers can—optionally—decide to call a by-election.

=== Electoral system ===
Voting for local assemblies is based on universal suffrage, comprising all Spanish nationals over 18 years of age, registered and residing in the municipality and with full political rights (provided that they have not been deprived of the right to vote by a final sentence), as well as resident non-national European citizens, and those whose country of origin allows reciprocal voting by virtue of a treaty.

Local councillors are elected using the D'Hondt method and closed-list proportional voting, with a five percent-threshold of valid votes (including blank ballots) in each municipality. Each municipality is a multi-member constituency, with a number of seats based on the following scale:

Population	Councillors
<100	3
101–250	5
251–1,000	7
1,001–2,000	9
2,001–5,000	11
5,001–10,000	13
10,001–20,000	17
20,001–50,000	21
50,001–100,000	25
>100,001	+1 per each 100,000 inhabitants or fraction +1 if total is an even number

The law does not provide for by-elections to fill vacant seats; instead, any vacancies arising after the proclamation of candidates and during the legislative term will be filled by the next candidates on the party lists or, when required, by designated substitutes.

=== Current council ===
The table below shows the composition of the political groups in the local assembly at the present time.

Current Council composition
Groups	Parties	Councillors	
Groups	Parties	Seats	Total
Together for Catalonia's Municipal Group	JxCat	11	11
Socialist Municipal Group	PSC	10	10
Barcelona in Common's Municipal Group	BComú	9	9
Republican Municipal Group	ERC	5	5
People's Party's Municipal Group	PP	4	4
Vox's Municipal Group	Vox	2	2

== Parties and candidates ==
The electoral law allows for parties and federations registered in the interior ministry, alliances and groupings of electors to present lists of candidates. Parties and federations intending to form an alliance are required to inform the relevant electoral commission within 10 days of the election call, whereas groupings of electors need to secure the signature of a determined amount of the electors registered in the municipality for which they seek election, disallowing electors from signing for more than one list. In the case of Barcelona, as its population is over 1,000,001, at least 8,000 signatures are required. Amendments in 2024 required a balanced composition of men and women in the electoral lists through the use of a zipper system.

Below is a list of the main parties and alliances which will likely contest the election:

Candidacy	Parties and alliances	Leading candidate	Ideology	Previous result		Gov.	Ref.
Candidacy	Parties and alliances	Leading candidate	Ideology	Vote %	Seats	Gov.	Ref.
Junts	List: Together for Catalonia (JxCat); Democrats of Catalonia (DC); Left Movement (MES); Catalan State (EC)	Jordi Martí	Catalan independence Populism	22.5%	11	No	
PSC–CP	List: Socialists' Party of Catalonia (PSC–PSOE); United to Advance (Els Units)	Jaume Collboni	Social democracy	19.8%	10	Yes	
BComú–C	List: Barcelona in Common (BComú); Catalonia in Common (CatComú) – United Left Catalonia (EUCat) – Greens Equo (Verds Equo) – Green Left (EV)	Gerardo Pisarello	Left-wing populism Participatory democracy	19.8%	9	No	
ERC–AM	List: Republican Left of Catalonia (ERC)	Elisenda Alamany	Catalan independence Left-wing nationalism Social democracy	11.2%	5	No	
PP	List: People's Party (PP)	Daniel Sirera	Conservatism; Christian democracy	9.2%	4	No	
Vox	List: Vox (Vox)	Gonzalo de Oro	Right-wing populism Ultranationalism; National conservatism	5.7%	2	No	
CUP	List: Popular Unity Candidacy (CUP); Internationalist Struggle (LI)	Laure Vega	Catalan independence Socialism	3.8%	0	No	
Aliança.cat	List: Catalan Alliance (Aliança.cat)	Jordi Aragonès	Catalan independence Anti-immigration; Nativism	Did not contest		No	

== Opinion polls ==
The tables below list opinion polling results in reverse chronological order, showing the most recent first and using the dates when the survey fieldwork was done, as opposed to the date of publication. Where the fieldwork dates are unknown, the date of publication is given instead. The highest percentage figure in each polling survey is displayed with its background shaded in the leading party's colour. If a tie ensues, this is applied to the figures with the highest percentages. The "Lead" column on the right shows the percentage-point difference between the parties with the highest percentages in a poll.

=== Graphical summary ===
Local regression trend line of poll results from 28 May 2023 to the present day, with each line corresponding to a political party.

=== Voting intention estimates ===
The table below lists weighted voting intention estimates. Refusals are generally excluded from the party vote percentages, while question wording and the treatment of "don't know" responses and those not intending to vote may vary between polling organisations. When available, seat projections determined by the polling organisations are displayed below (or in place of) the percentages in a smaller font; 21 seats are required for an absolute majority in the City Council of Barcelona.

Polling firm/Commissioner	Fieldwork date	Sample size	Turnout	JxCat	PSC	BComú	ERC	PP	Vox	CUP	Podem	Aliança.cat	SALF	Lead
GAPS/Junts	15–25 Sep 2026	800	?	14.3– 16.3; 6/8	17.5– 19.5; 8/10	12.8– 14.8; 5/7	15.5– 17.1; 7/9	8.6– 9.9; 4/5	6.9– 8.2; 3/4	3.6– 5.1; 0/2	–	8.3– 9.4; 3/6	–	2.0– 2.4
GESOP/El Periódico	10–21 Sep 2026	802	?	11.9; 5/6	20.2; 9/10	12.2; 5/6	14.0; 6/7	8.3; 3/4	7.5; 3/4	6.0; 2/3	–	11.5; 5/6	–	6.2
Takticom/Metrópoli	20 Jul 2026	?	?	9.6; 4/5	23.7; 11/12	12.6; 5/6	17.4; 7/8	10.8; 4/5	7.6; 3/4	6.0; 0/2	–	12.4; 5/6	–	6.3
Opinòmetre (Pròxima Estació) (Note: Alternative projection based on raw Opinòmetre data.)	26 May–3 Jun 2026	800	?	8.4; 3/4	21.2; 10/11	11.4; 5/6	17.7; 8/9	11.1; 5	11.7; 5/6	4.8; 0/2	–	9.2; 4/5	–	3.5
Celeste-Tel/ERC	17–25 Nov 2025	803	59.0	11.6; 6	20.5; 10	15.1; 7	16.5; 8	9.5; 4	6.1; 3	4.8; 0	–	10.0; 5	–	4.0
GESOP/El Periódico	15–19 Sep 2025	801	?	14.8; 7	23.5; 11/12	14.2; 6/7	13.0; 6	8.2; 3/4	7.0; 3	5.0; 0/2	–	5.4; 2	–	8.7
GESOP/El Periódico	13–18 Sep 2024	800	?	18.4; 8/9	23.1; 11/12	17.0; 8	11.2; 5	9.5; 4	5.8; 2/3	5.0; 0/1	–	–	–	4.7
EM-Analytics/Electomanía	28 Aug–15 Sep 2024	1,002	?	18.9; 9	23.5; 12	17.1; 8	10.2; 5	11.3; 5	5.5; 2	3.6; 0	–	4.5; 0	–	4.6
2024 EP election	9 Jun 2024	—N/a	49.6	15.9 (7)	29.9 (15)	6.2 (3)	13.8 (6)	15.8 (7)	5.0 (0)	–	6.7 (3)	–	2.0 (0)	14.0
EM-Analytics/Electomanía	1 Apr–15 May 2024	1,280	?	20.7; 9	21.9; 10	17.3; 8	10.4; 5	11.1; 5	5.9; 2	3.4; 0	–	5.2; 2	–	1.2
2024 regional election	12 May 2024	—N/a	61.3	19.6 (9)	27.9 (13)	8.9 (4)	12.9 (6)	13.8 (6)	6.2 (3)	4.7 (0)	–	2.1 (0)	–	8.3
2023 general election	23 Jul 2023	—N/a	67.4	10.4 (4)	33.2 (15)	16.9 (8)	12.2 (5)	15.9 (7)	5.8 (2)	2.7 (0)	(Note: Within Sumar.)	–	–	16.3
2023 municipal election	28 May 2023	—N/a	60.6	22.5; 11	19.8; 10	19.8; 9	11.2; 5	9.2; 4	5.7; 2	3.8; 0	–	–	–	2.7

=== Voting preferences ===
The table below lists raw, unweighted voting preferences.

Polling firm/Commissioner	Fieldwork date	Sample size	JxCat	PSC	BComú	ERC	PP	Vox	CUP	Podem	Aliança.cat	Question	X mark	Lead
GAPS/Junts	15–25 Sep 2026	800	7.1	9.9	6.1	9.1	5.5	4.4	2.2	–	6.4	32.6	11.6	0.8
GESOP/El Periódico	10–21 Sep 2026	802	5.7	16.7	8.0	13.5	4.6	5.2	5.7	1.5	6.7	17.2	8.3	3.2
Opinòmetre/City Council	26 May–3 Jun 2026	800	2.6	13.0	4.7	11.1	3.1	2.7	2.3	–	3.3	45.1	9.8	1.9
Opinòmetre/City Council	17–25 Nov 2025	803	3.4	12.1	6.9	7.8	2.4	2.1	2.3	–	3.9	43.2	12.5	4.3
GESOP/El Periódico	15–19 Sep 2025	801	5.6	18.4	8.2	11.7	2.8	3.4	3.3	–	2.7	24.3	10.5	6.7
Opinòmetre/City Council	26 May–3 Jun 2025	807	4.0	16.1	7.9	7.5	2.4	1.9	2.7	–	2.0	38.0	11.3	8.2
CIS	7–31 Mar 2025	971	5.3	22.7	7.5	8.2	6.6	3.0	2.3	–	4.2	28.8	5.8	14.5
Opinòmetre/City Council	25 Nov–4 Dec 2024	805	5.7	14.4	8.7	5.8	2.4	1.1	3.8	–	–	38.0	15.5	5.7
GESOP/El Periódico	13–18 Sep 2024	800	8.0	18.5	10.9	7.9	3.9	1.6	4.0	–	–	30.6	9.0	7.6
Opinòmetre/City Council	25 Jun–4 Jul 2024	807	7.3	17.2	10.8	9.7	2.6	1.1	3.3	–	–	30.4	14.5	6.4
2024 EP election (Note: Does not include non-resident citizens.)	9 Jun 2024	—N/a	7.9	14.8	3.1	6.9	7.8	2.5	–	3.3	–	—N/a	50.4	14.1
2024 regional election	12 May 2024	—N/a	12.0	17.0	5.4	7.9	8.4	3.8	2.9	–	1.3	—N/a	38.6	5.0
Opinòmetre/City Council	15–24 Nov 2023	825	7.5	13.5	11.5	8.2	2.5	0.8	2.5	–	–	37.4	13.0	2.0
2023 general election	23 Jul 2023	—N/a	6.9	22.2	11.3	8.2	10.6	3.9	1.8		–	—N/a	32.6	10.9
2023 municipal election	28 May 2023	—N/a	13.5	11.9	11.9	6.7	5.5	3.4	2.3	–	–	—N/a	39.4	1.6

=== Preferred Mayor ===
The table below lists opinion polling on leader preferences to become mayor of Barcelona.

Polling firm/Commissioner	Fieldwork date	Sample size													Other/ None/ Not care	Question	Lead
Polling firm/Commissioner	Fieldwork date	Sample size	Trias JxCat	Martí JxCat	Collboni PSC	Colau BComú–C	Sanz BComú–C	Pisarello BComú–C	Maragall ERC	Alamany ERC	Rufián ERC	Sirera PP	Oro-Pulido Vox	Aragonès AC	Other/ None/ Not care	Question	Lead
GESOP/El Periódico	10–21 Sep 2026	802	–	2.7	19.9	–	–	8.0	–	8.3	–	2.6	1.0	3.4	32.2	22.0	11.6
Opinòmetre/City Council	26 May–3 Jun 2026	800	2.4	0.1	11.5	3.0	–	1.4	–	1.7	2.0	0.6	–	–	13.1	64.1	8.5
CIS	7–31 Mar 2025	971	2.1	1.3	18.1	7.2	1.8	–	0.6	2.6	–	1.8	1.5	–	5.6	55.1	10.9
Opinòmetre/City Council	30 May–8 Jun 2023	808	44.5	–	18.3	12.7	–	–	2.1	–	–	0.5	0.3	–	0.4	21.2	26.2

=== Predicted Mayor ===
The table below lists opinion polling on the perceived likelihood for each leader to become mayor.

Polling firm/Commissioner	Fieldwork date	Sample size						Other/ None/ Not care	Question	Lead
Polling firm/Commissioner	Fieldwork date	Sample size	Martí JxCat	Collboni PSC	Pisarello BComú–C	Alamany ERC	Sirera PP	Other/ None/ Not care	Question	Lead
Opinòmetre/City Council	26 May–3 Jun 2026	800	0.1	30.8	0.5	0.8	0.2	2.0	65.7	30.0

== Bibliography ==
- Constitución Española (Constitution). Official State Gazette (in Spanish). 27 December 1978 [version as of 20 May 2026]. BOE-A-1978-31229.
- Ley 7/1985, de 2 de abril, Reguladora de las Bases del Régimen Local (Law 7/1985). Official State Gazette (in Spanish). 2 April 1985 [version as of 3 June 2026]. BOE-A-1985-5392.
- Ley Orgánica 5/1985, de 19 de junio, del Régimen Electoral General (Organic Law 5/1985). Official State Gazette (in Spanish). 19 June 1985 [version as of 2 July 2026]. BOE-A-1985-11672.
