= Jordi Martí i Galbis =

Spanish politician of the party Together for Catalonia

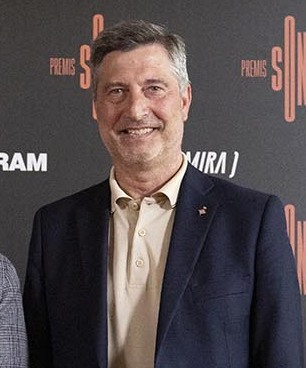

Jordi Martí i Galbis (born 1961) is a politician of the party Together for Catalonia. He has served as a member of the Congress of Deputies (2000–2004), the Provincial Deputation of Barcelona (2017–2019) and the City Council of Barcelona (2011–), and is his party's leader in the last of those bodies since 2024.

== Biography ==
Born in Barcelona, Martí graduated with a law degree from the University of Barcelona. As a member of Convergence and Union (CiU), he was a deputy in the Congress of Deputies for the Barcelona constituency.

In 2011, Martí was elected to the City Council of Barcelona. In the government of mayor Xavier Trias, he was put in charge of the district of Sants-Montjuïc. He had previously been Trias's head of cabinet when the latter was minister of health in the Generalitat de Catalunya in the 1990s.

In 2015, Trias lost control of the city council to Ada Colau. Martí was elected president of the municipal council in the district of Sarrià-Sant Gervasi. When Elsa Artadi resigned in 2022, he replaced her as the spokesperson of Junts in the city council. In July 2024, Trias left politics, and Martí succeeded him as Junts's leader in the city council, with the party in opposition to Jaume Collboni of the Socialists' Party of Catalonia (PSC).
