= Teresa Forcades =

Catalan Benedictine nun, theologian, physician and activist

Teresa Forcades OSB
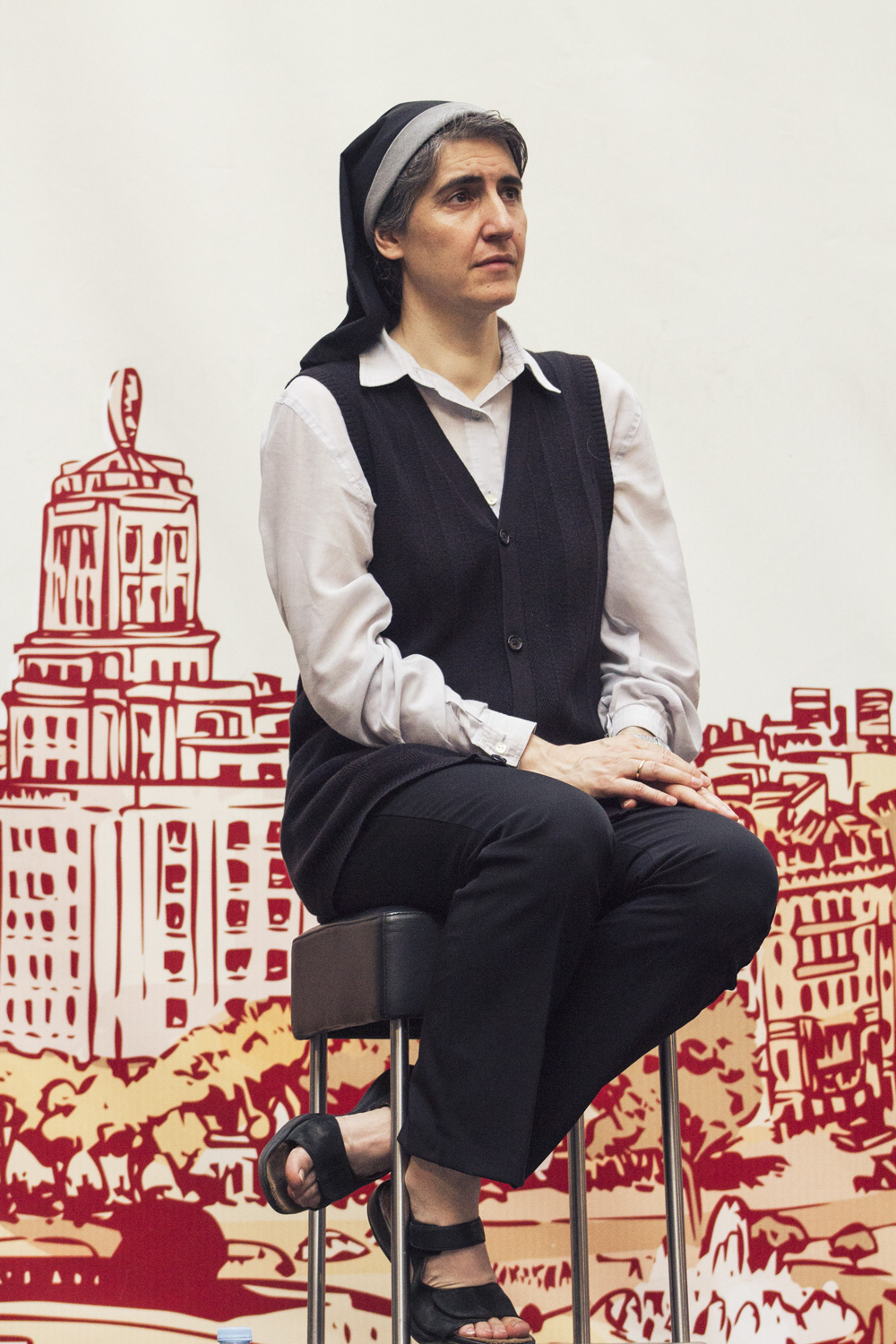
- Forcades in 2015
- Born: Teresa Forcades i Vila; 10 May 1966 (age 60); Barcelona, Catalonia, Spain
- Education: University of Barcelona; Harvard University
- Occupation: Benedictine nun
- Known for: Christian feminism; public health activism; Catalan independence activism

Teresa Forcades i Vila (Note: Catalan pronunciation: [t(ə)ˈɾɛzə fuɾˈkaðəs].) OSB (born 10 May 1966 in Barcelona) is a Catalan physician, Benedictine nun and social activist. Forcades i Vila is known for her controversial views on the church, public health and Catalan independence, and for her vaccine skepticism.

== Education ==
Born in Barcelona in 1966, Forcades grew up in a home where her parents rejected religion. She was sent, however, to the private Sacred Heart school, where she discovered religious faith through the study of the Bible given by the religious sisters who ran the school. She went on to study medicine at the University of Barcelona. In 1992 she moved to the United States, where in 1995 she completed a residency at the University of Buffalo School of Medicine, specialising in internal medicine. After obtaining a scholarship, she moved to Cambridge, Massachusetts, where she gained the degree of Master of Divinity from Harvard Divinity School in 1997.

As the result of a stay in order to prepare for some examinations which Forcades made at the Monastery of St. Benedict in Montserrat, Spain, founded in 1952, and connected to the famed Abbey of Santa Maria de Montserrat, she received a call to monastic life. In September 1997, she entered the monastery, where she follows the Benedictine pattern of life, while still working in the fields of religious study, theology and medicine. In 2004 she obtained a doctorate in public health from the University of Barcelona. In 2005, she obtained a degree in theology. After four years, in 2009 she received a doctorate from the School of Theology of Catalonia.

== Political positions ==
=== Feminism ===
Forcades understands feminism as a form of liberation theology. Forcades has openly criticised the Catholic church as "misogynist and patriarchal in its structure". She has developed her thoughts on this in the light of liberation theology.

=== Catalan independence ===
In 2013, Forcades co-authored the Manifesto for the Convening of a Constituent Process in Catalonia with economist Arcadi Oliveres. In it they proposed achieving independence for Catalonia through new political and social model based on self-organisation and social mobilisation. Her political activism resulted in The Guardian labelling her as "one of the most outspoken ... leaders of southern Europe's far left".

In 2015, as another major vote for Catalan independence approached, Forcades received permission from her superior and the Holy See to set aside her habit and don secular attire, entering the political arena to lead the leftist Procés Constituent movement. She remarked, "Criticisms are to be expected. I follow somebody called Jesus and he had a lot of that." In 2018, she returned to the monastery of Sant Benet in Montserrat to resume her life as a contemplative nun.

=== Vaccination ===
Since at least 2009, Forcades has espoused views about what she says are the dangers of vaccines. A 2009 article in El País criticized Forcades' stance on the reliability of influenza vaccines. The critical stance taken by the article was later defended by the newspaper's public editor Milagros Pérez Oliva. In 2021, the New York Times criticised her for her vaccine skepticism in relation to the COVID-19 pandemic.

== Writings ==
Forcades has written three books:

- La Trinitat avui (The Trinity Today) (Publicacions de l’Abadia de Montserrat, 2005)
- Els crims de les grans companyies farmacèutiques (The Crimes of Big Pharmaceutical Companies) (Cristianisme i Justícia, 2006)
- La teologia feminista en la història (Feminist Theology in History) (Fragmenta Editorial, 2007)

== Recognition ==
She was recognized as one of the BBC 100 Women of 2013.
