= Jordi Aragonès =

Catalan politician (born 1993)

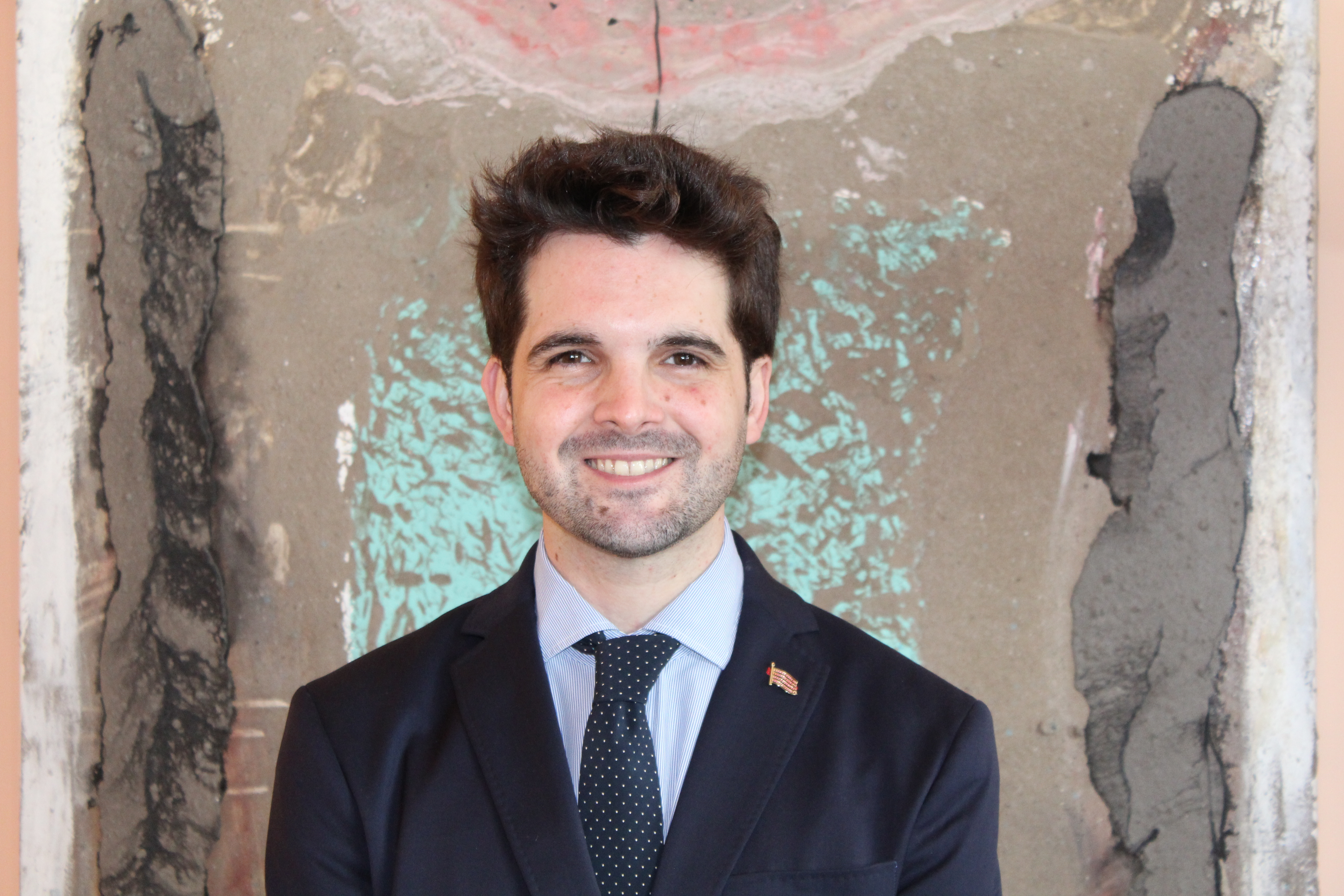
- Born: 1993 (age 32–33); Pineda de Mar (Spain)
- Education: University of Barcelona; University of Girona
- Political party: Catalan Alliance (since 2020)
- Website: salvembarcelona.cat

Jordi Aragonès i Martínez (born 1993) is a Spanish politician, historian and teacher. He is considered the ideologist of the Catalan party Aliança Catalana.

Aragonès is the party's candidate for mayor of Barcelona in the upcoming 2027 local elections.

== Biography ==
He graduated with a history degree from the University of Barcelona and then got a master's degree in Modern History and Current World. Aragonès also received a master's degree in Teacher Training from the University of Girona (required to teach in secondary education in Spain). He has worked as professor for the National University of Distance Education and as teacher in a highschool.

Aragonès is one of the founders of the Aliança Catalana (Catalan Alliance) party, a nationalist, independentist and anti-immigration party. He is considered the main ideologist of the party, and in the 2024 Catalan regional election he was the second candidate of the conscription of Barcelona, however the party didn't secure any seat.

He previously formed part of the youth group of the Democratic Union of Catalonia, where he then became a member until its dissolution in 2017. He also founded the Catalan Democratic Movement with Vic mayor Josep Vila de Abadal.

In June 2026, Aliança confirmed Aragonès would be running as candidate for mayor of the Barcelona City Council in the 2027 local elections.

== Ideology ==
He considers himself to be right-wing in the political spectrum, however media sources label him as far-right. He identifies himself as a Catalan nationalist, an advocate of Catalan independence, liberal economically and conservative socially. He promotes the reindustrialization of Catalonia, unilateral independence and stricter border control. He has expressed strong opposition to Islam, what he describes as contrary and incompatible with western values.

He has been critical of the 2012-2022 procés and traditional Catalan parties (ERC, Junts and CUP).

== Personal life ==
He is cousin of Pere Aragonès, former president of the Government of Catalonia. He is also grandson of Josep Aragonès, mayor of Pineda de Mar during francoist Spain.

Aragonès was born in Pineda de Mar in 1993.

== Publications ==
- Després del procés, què?: Reflexions de la generació que ve ("After the procés, what? Thoughts of the upcoming generation", cowritten with several authors, Pagès Editors, 2019, ISBN 978-84-1303-040-1)
