= HIJOS =

Two human rights organizations based in Argentina and Guatemala

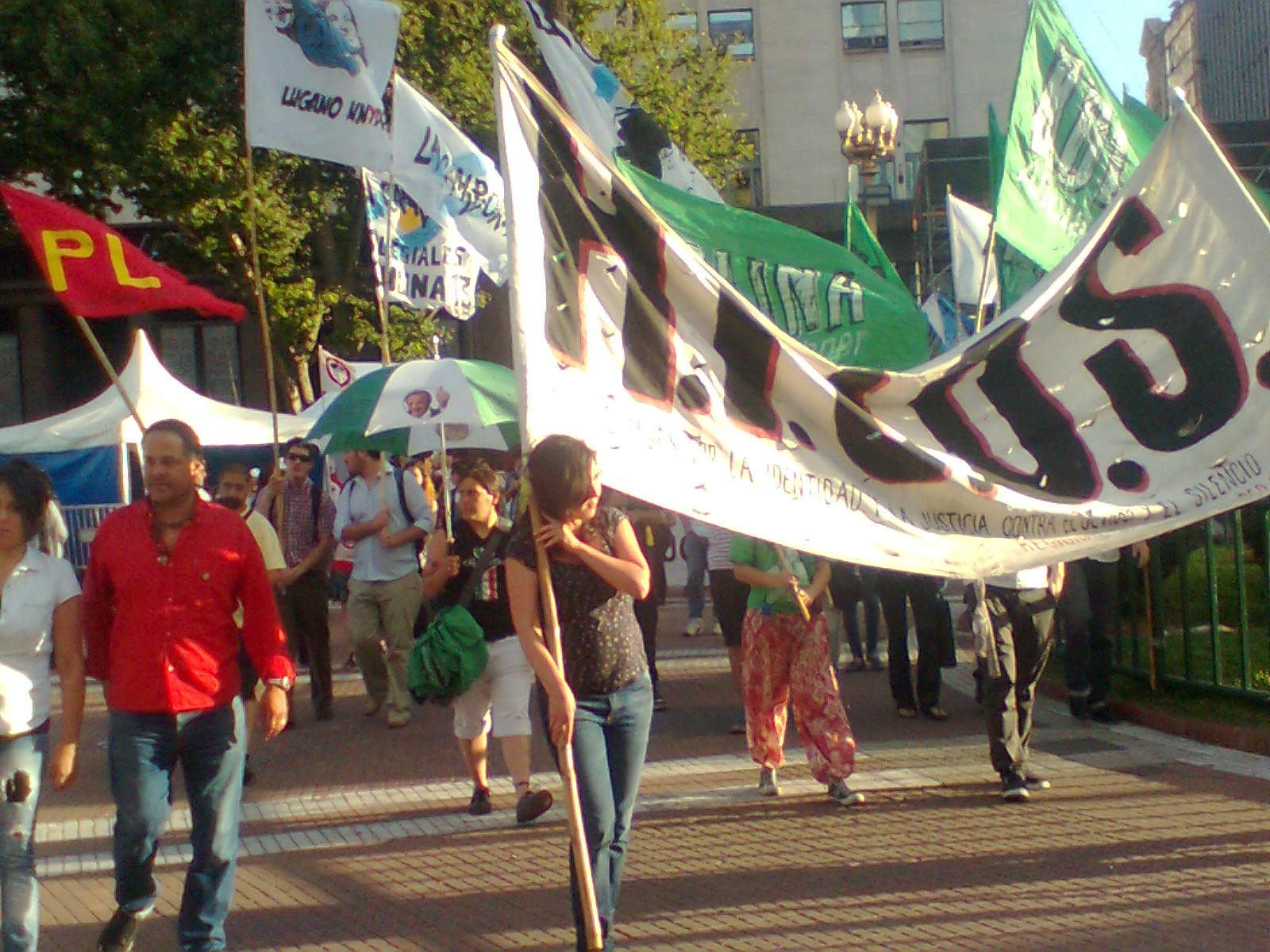
Members of HIJOS at the 33rd March of Resistance at the Plaza de Mayo in December 2013.

HIJOS is a recursive acronym for Hijas e Hijos por la Identidad y la Justicia contra el Olvido y el Silencio (English: Daughters and Sons for Identity and Justice Against Forgetfulness and Silence). It is the name of an Argentine organisation of children of people who were forcibly "disappeared" by the military dictatorship. It was founded in 1995 in the Argentine town of Río Ceballos, north of Córdoba, by activists from different parts of the country. The organisation started to perform escraches to raise public awareness about former dirty-war criminals being free despite their crimes in 1995.

== History ==
Towards the end of 1994, a group of children of missing people held a meeting at the Faculty of Architecture of the National University of La Plata, during a tribute to the missing people who were part of the faculty. After this event, the group joined were invited to join an event by the “Julio Cortázar Workshop”. The meeting was held in Río Ceballos, where the group HIJOS first emerged, being one of the first groups to form around the identity of children of disappeared people. In October of 1995, the organisation held its first national congress to establish its goals and mode of operation.

In October 1996, 6 activists of HIJOS were beaten during a rock festival for the freedom of political prisoners which took place in Plaza de Mayo, when it came to clashes with the police. 5 of the activists were imprisoned. In response, group called for a "national day of shame" march that was banned. During this time, the organisation started to use escraches as a method for raising awareness.

== In other countries ==
HIJOS in Guatemala founded themselves in 1999 and are based in Guatemala City, they have received many death threats from government sympathizers. In their work they raise awareness by painting graffiti style murals dealing with the death of their relatives and how Guatemalan youth and Mayan youth are treated in the country.
