= Escrache =

Activism by public harassment of officials

An escrache (Spanish pronunciation: [esˈkɾa.t͡ʃe]) is a type of direct action demonstration which involves publicly harassing public figures, usually by congregating around their homes, chanting, and publicly shaming them. In Argentina, the term was coined by the human rights group HIJOS, to condemn the genocides committed by members of the Proceso de Reorganización Nacional who were pardoned by Carlos Menem.

In Chile, these actions are known as funa. In Peru, they are known as roche and are often signed "El roche".

In Spain in 2013, a number the Platform of Mortgage Victims (PAH) held escraches against members of the parliament who were not willing to sign a popular legislative initiative (ILP) supported by 90% of the population, to allow the repossession of homes to cancel out mortgage debt. Without this law, homeless former owners would be forced to continue paying the banks after losing their homes. The PAH's campaign – "There are lives at stake" – referred to the high rates of suicide among those evicted, and detailed strict guidelines of how escraches were to be conducted in nonviolent manner, without insults or affecting the children of the deputies.

== Origin of the term ==
The lunfardo term "escracho" has been used for some time in Río de la Plata. It was mentioned by Benigno B. Lugones in 1879 referring to a scam in which a lottery ticket supposedly naming the victim is presented to them and they are asked to pay to receive it, for an amount which is inferior to the amount they have "won" in the lottery. Escrache might also have come from the Genoese synonym for a photo "scraccé", "scraccé" also passed to mean make a portrait, or more recently to smash someone's face in. Another proposed origin is the English to scratch (the tickets used in the lottery scam were scratched to modify the number) or the Italian scaracchio meaning spit.

The term came into wider use in 1995 by the human rights group HIJOS, when Carlos Menem pardoned members of the Proceso de Reorganización Nacional who were accused of human rights violations and genocide. Using chants, music, graffiti, banners, throwing eggs, street theater, etc., they informed neighbors of the presence of murderers in the neighborhood. Over a decade passed before those responsible for the murders committed under the regime of Jorge Rafael Videla were brought to trial for their alleged crimes.

== See also ==
- Doxing
- Online shaming
