= Procés Constituent =

- Spokesperson: Teresa Forcades; Arcadi Oliveres
- Founded: 10 April 2013
- Headquarters: Barcelona
- Ideology: Anti-capitalism; Catalan independence Republicanism
- Political position: Left-wing

Website
- www.procesconstituent.cat/ca/

Procés Constituent (English: "Constituent Process") is a Catalan social movement, launched on 10 April 2013. It is anti-capitalist and pro-Catalan independence, calling for "A Republic of the 99%".

== Origins ==
The initial founders of Procés Constituent were the economist and activist Arcadi Oliveres and themedical doctor and nun Teresa Forcades, who launched the initiative by publishing a Manifesto: call for a constituent process in Catalonia. More than 10,000 signed the manifesto in the first week.

== Electoral participation ==
Procés Constituent stood with Barcelona en Comú in the May 2015 municipal elections in Barcelona. Procés Constituent members Gerardo Pisarello and Jaume Asens were both elected to the city council to form part of the new government.

After negotiations, Procés Constituent decided not to stand with Catalunya Sí que es Pot or the Popular Unity Candidacy (CUP) in the 2015 Catalan parliamentary elections.
