= Gerardo Pisarello =

Spanish-Argentine politician and jurist

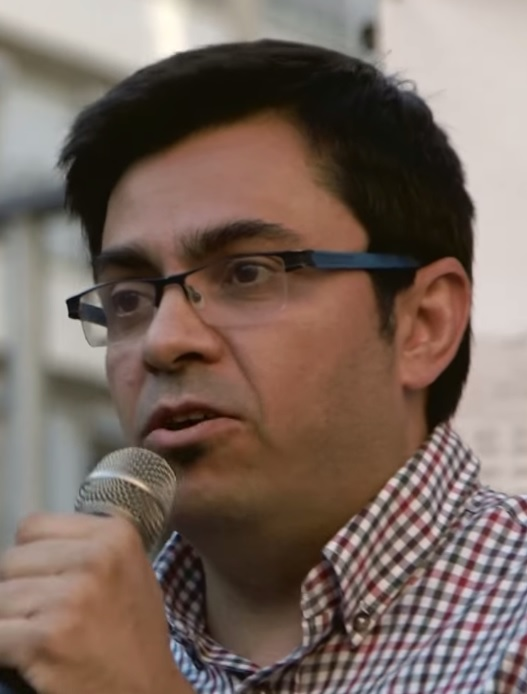
- Pisarello in 2015

First Secretary of the Congress of Deputies
- Incumbent
- Assumed office 21 May 2019
- Preceded by: Alicia Sánchez-Camacho

First Deputy Mayor of Barcelona
- In office 13 June 2015 – 15 June 2019
- Mayor: Ada Colau
- Preceded by: Joaquim Forn
- Succeeded by: Jaume Collboni

Member of the Congress of Deputies
- Incumbent
- Assumed office 21 May 2019
- Constituency: Barcelona

Member of the Barcelona City Council
- In office 13 June 2015 – 15 June 2019

Personal details
- Born: Gerardo Pisarello Prados; 10 August 1970 (age 56) Tucumán, Argentina
- Citizenship: Spanish · Argentine
- Party: Barcelona en Comú (2014–present); Catalunya en Comú (2017–present)
- Education: National University of Tucumán; Complutense University of Madrid
- Profession: Law professor

Gerardo Pisarello Prados (Spanish: [xeˈɾaɾðo pisaˈɾelo]; born 10 August 1970) is a Spanish-Argentine politician and jurist, member of the 13th Congress of Deputies. A member of Barcelona en Comú, he served as First Deputy Mayor of Barcelona between 2015 and 2019, with responsibility for Work, Economy and Strategic Planning.

== Political and academic career ==
A former professor in constitutional law at the University of Barcelona, he was elected to the Barcelona City Council as part of the Barcelona en Comú municipal platform.

He is the author of numerous books on constitutionalism, human rights and the right to the city and writes for Público, Eldiario.es and Sin Permiso.

Pisarello was vice president of the DESC Observatory for over ten years and was one of the founding members of the anti-capitalist and pro-independence Procés Constituent.

He is a member of the Advisory Panel of DiEM25.
