= Carina Mejías Sánchez =

Spanish politician

María Caridad Mejías Sánchez MP
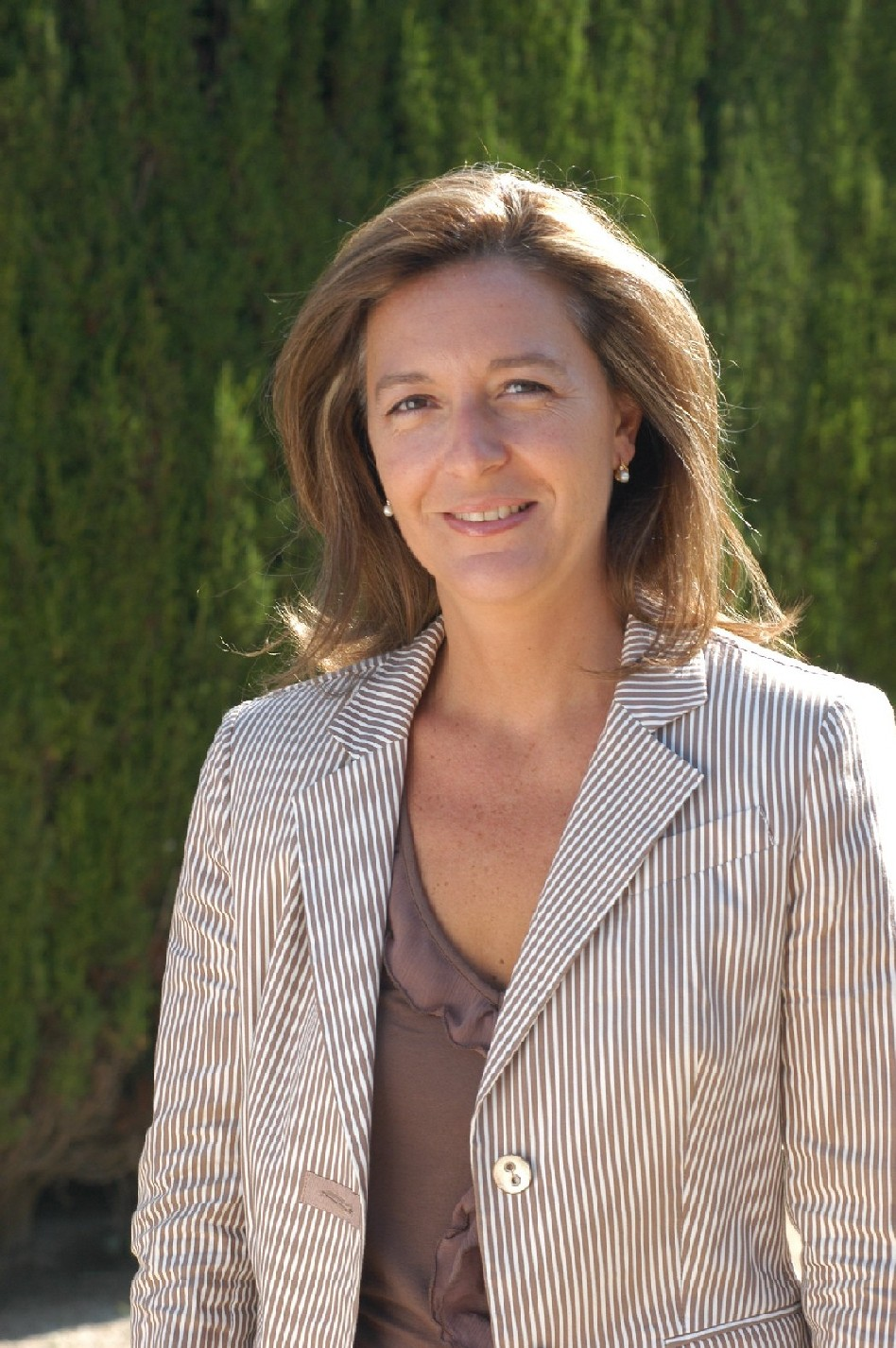

Member of the Congress of Deputies
- Incumbent
- Assumed office 17 August 2023
- Constituency: Barcelona

Member of the Parliament of Catalonia
- In office 29 October 1999 – 4 August 2015
- Constituency: Barcelona

Member of the Congress of Deputies
- In office 22 July 2019 – 3 December 2019
- Constituency: Barcelona

Personal details
- Born: María Caridad Mejías Sánchez; 19 June 1964 (age 62) Barcelona, Spain
- Party: Vox (2023–present)
- Other political affiliations: People's Party (1991–2012); Citizens (2012–2020)
- Education: University of Barcelona; Abat Oliba CEU University

María Caridad Mejías Sánchez (born 19 June 1964) also known as Carina Mejías is a Spanish politician, lawyer and journalist who has been a Member of the Congress of Deputies since 2023 for Vox.

She started her political career as a member of the People's Party and was elected as a member of the PP in the Catalan Parliament in 1999 before moving to the Citizens party in 2012. In 2019, she served as a substitute member of the Congress of Deputies to take over from Toni Roldán.

== Biography ==
Mejías graduated with a degree in law at the University of Barcelona before gaining a master's degree in social studies and constitutional law from Abat Oliba CEU University. She worked as a court attorney in Barcelona and is a member of the Barcelona Bar Association. She was also a columnist for El Mundo newspaper.

She became active in the local youth association of the People's Party (PP) in 1991 and in 1993 was elected as a city councilor in Barcelona for the party. In 1999, Mejías was elected as a deputy in the Parliament of Catalonia for the PP. In October 2012, she announced she was leaving the PP to sit as an independent but subsequently joined the Catalonian Citizens party. She applied to be the Citizens candidate for the mayoral election in Barcelona in 2014 but was unsuccessful. From 2017 to 2020 she served as the Citizen's party spokeswoman for tourism and culture.

Mejías announced her resignation from Citizens in 2020, citing her disagreement with the party's COVID-19 policies and the direction of the party. For the 2023 Spanish general election, Mejías was announced as a candidate for the nationalist Vox party and stood in the Barcelona constituency. She was subsequently elected as a deputy in the Congress.
