= Ada Colau =

Spanish politician (born 1974)

- Colau in 2024

118th Mayor of Barcelona
- In office 13 June 2015 – 17 June 2023
- First Deputy: Gerardo Pisarello (2015–2019); Jaume Collboni (2019–2023)
- Preceded by: Xavier Trias
- Succeeded by: Jaume Collboni

Member of the Barcelona City Council
- In office 13 June 2015 – 25 October 2024
- Succeeded by: Jordi Rabassa

Personal details
- Born: Ada Colau Ballano; 3 March 1974 (age 52) Barcelona, Catalonia, Spain
- Party: Barcelona en Comú (2014–present); Catalunya en Comú (2017–present)
- Other political affiliations: Plataforma de Afectados por la Hipoteca (2009–present)
- Domestic partner: Adriá Alemany Salafranca
- Children: 2
- Occupation: Activist, writer, politician
- Website: adacolau.cat/en

Ada Colau Ballano (Catalan: [ˈaðə kuˈlaw] Spanish: [ˈaða koˈlaw]; born 3 March 1974) is a Spanish activist and politician who was Mayor of Barcelona between 2015 and 2023. On 13 June 2015 she was elected Mayor of Barcelona, the first woman to hold the office, as part of the citizen municipalist platform, Barcelona En Comú. Colau was one of the founding members and spokespeople of the Plataforma de Afectados por la Hipoteca (PAH) (Platform for People Affected by Mortgages), which was set up in Barcelona in 2009 in response to the rise in evictions caused by unpaid mortgage loans and the collapse of the Spanish property market in the wake of the 2008 financial crisis. Colau is the leading candidate of the Broad Front in the 2026 Spanish general election.

== Early and personal life ==
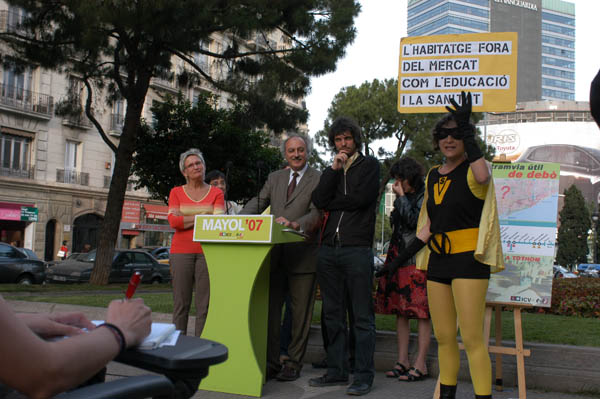
Colau dressed as SuperVivienda (Super Housing) protesting in favor of public housing at a ICV–EUiA meeting ahead of the 2007 Barcelona City Council election

Ada Colau was born in Barcelona and grew up in the Guinardó neighbourhood. She went to school at the Santa Anna and Febrer Academies, and went on to study philosophy at the University of Barcelona, but lacks the pertinent degree due to leaving her studies one course before completion, which she claims was due to economic instability in her family. She went on Erasmus in Italy at the University of Milan.

Colau has openly referred to herself as bisexual. She and her partner Adrià Alemany Salafranca have two children.

Aside from Catalan and Spanish, her native tongues, she also speaks fluent Italian.

She joined the 2024 Gaza freedom flotilla, citing the deliberate starvation of Gazans during the Gaza war.

== Platform for People Affected by Mortgages ==
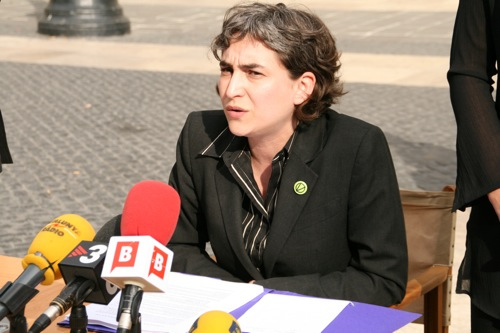
Colau in 2006

Ada Colau was one of the founding members of the Platform for People Affected by Mortgages (PAH) in 2009, and acted as the organization's spokeswoman until 2014. Colau rose to national prominence after calling a representative of the Spanish Banking Association "a criminal" while representing the PAH at a parliamentary hearing on the housing crisis in February 2013. Colau supports the use of escraches, public protests outside the homes of government officials.

In March, Madrid Government delegate Cristina Cifuentes of the People's Party accused Colau of supporting the Basque radical nationalist party Bildu. Colau is coauthor of the book Mortgaged Lives, based on her experiences of grassroots campaigning and direct action with the PAH.

== Barcelona en Comú and Mayor of Barcelona ==
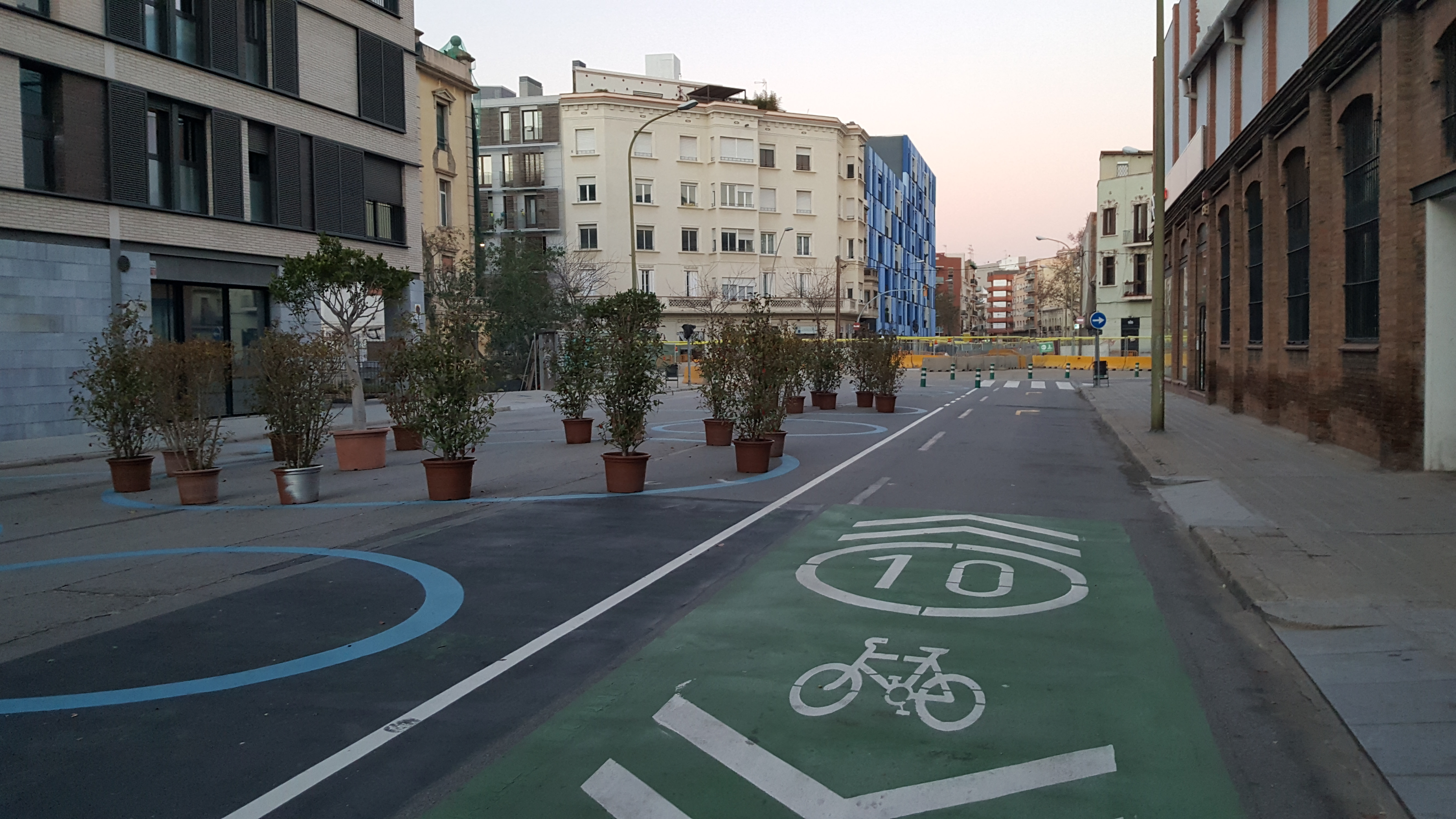
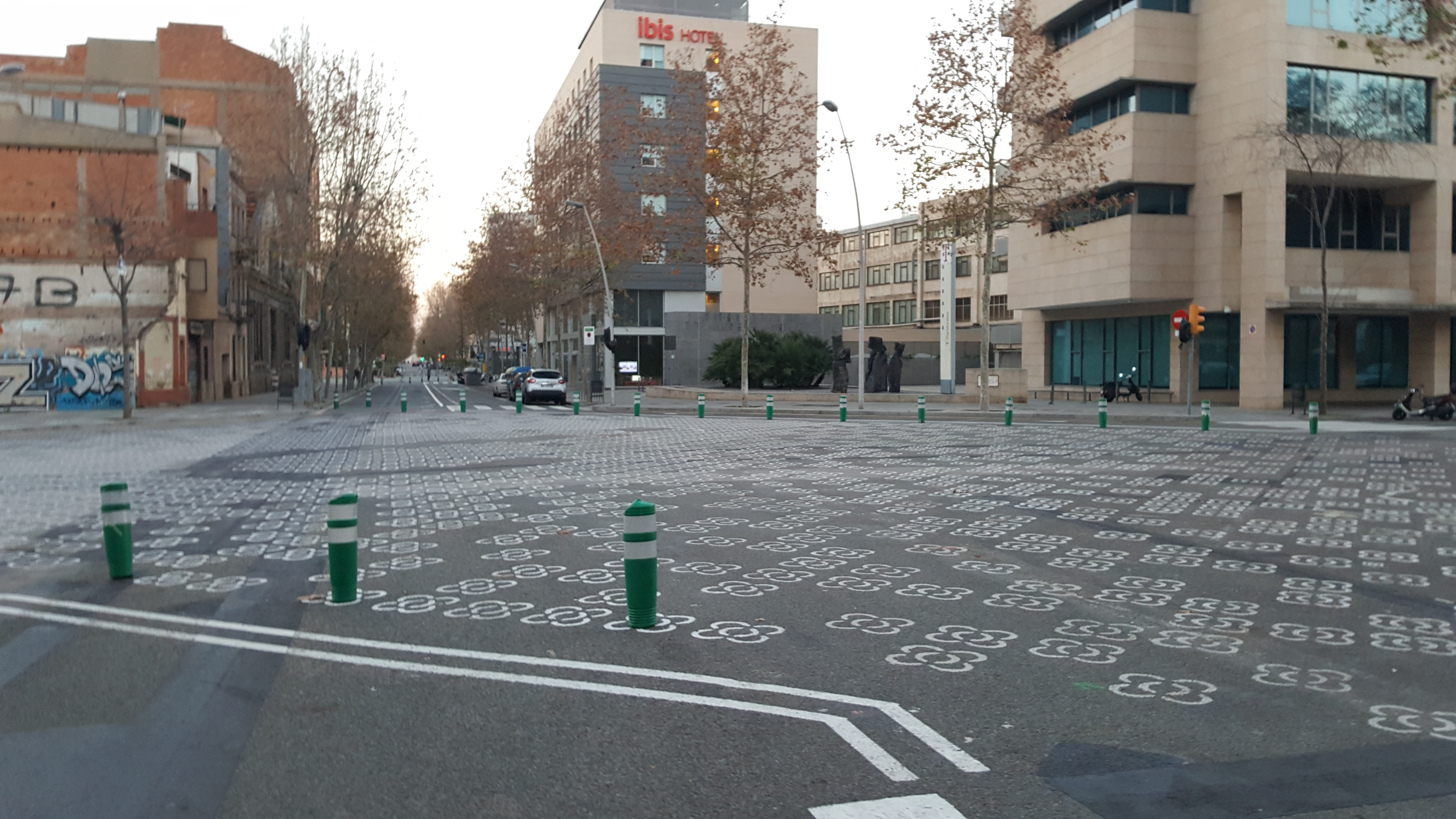
First (testing) iteration of superilles in 2017 at El Parc i la Llacuna del Poblenou (Superilla Poblenou)
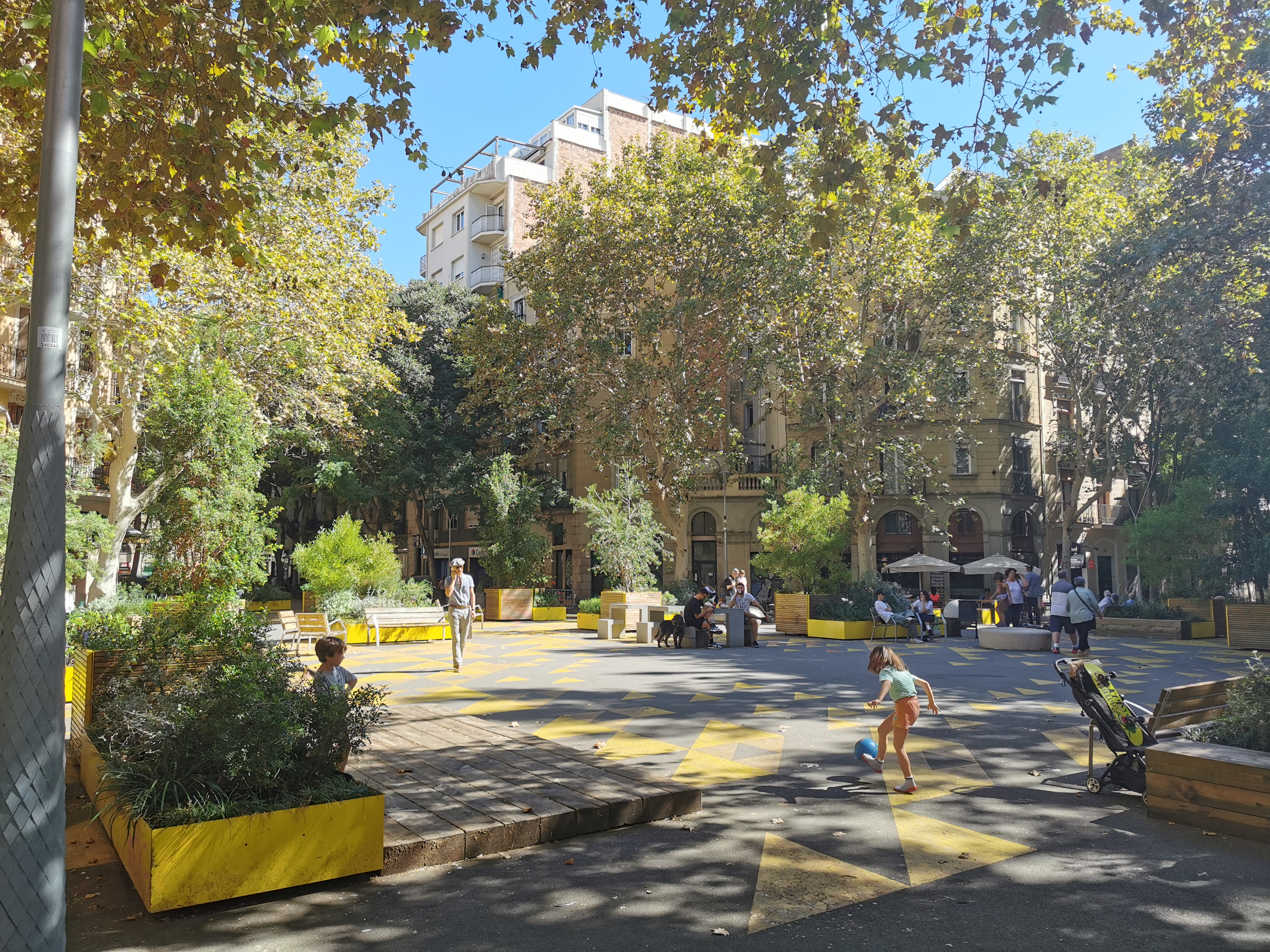
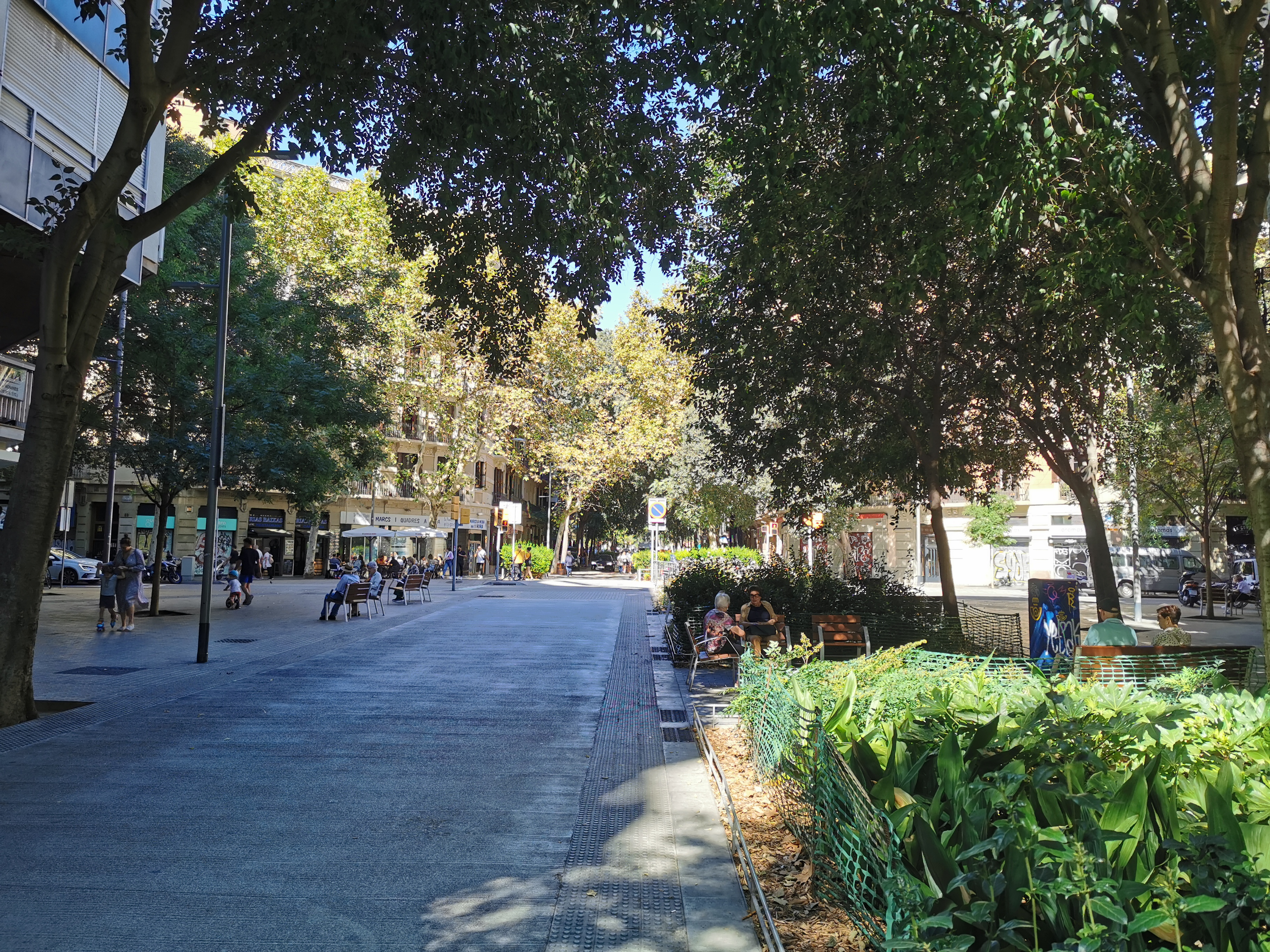
Final iteration of superilles at Sant Antoni in September 2023

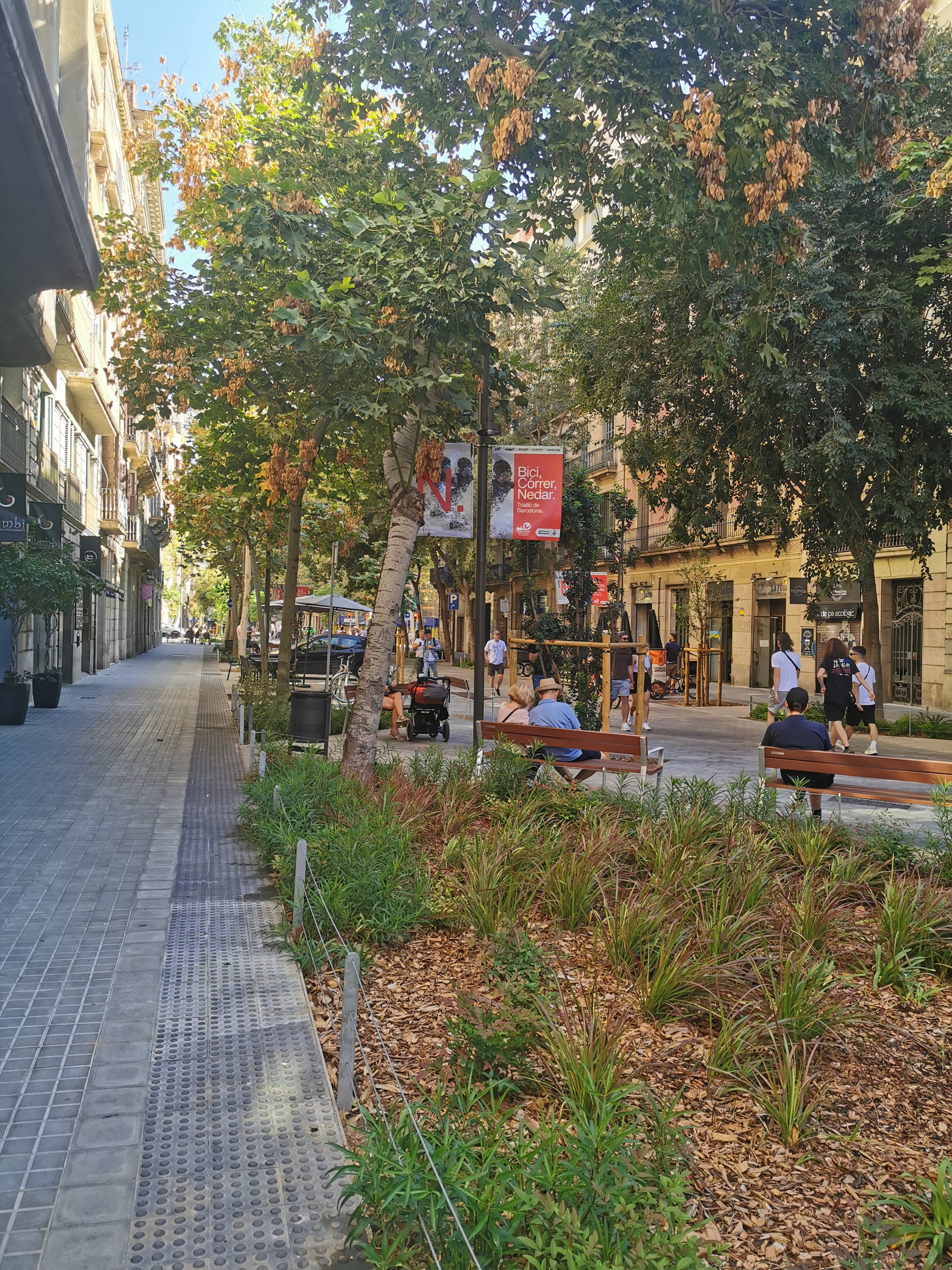
Superilla Consell de Cent at Eixample, the longest pedestrianized street (2,8 km)

On 7 May 2014, Ada Colau announced her resignation as spokesperson of the PAH. In June 2014 she founded Barcelona en Comú (formerly known as Guanyem Barcelona), a citizen platform that stood in the May 2015 Barcelona municipal elections. Barcelona en Comú won a plurality in the elections (11 of 41 city council seats) and on 13 June 2015 she was sworn in as mayor with the favourable vote of an absolute majority of councillors. She headed again the Barcelona en Comú list vis-à-vis the 26 May 2019 Barcelona municipal election. The list came up second, close to the ERC list headed by Ernest Maragall, with the same number of municipal councillors (10) as the latter. On 15 June 2019, during the inaugural session of the new municipal council, Colau commanded a qualified majority of the plenary for the investiture vote (21 out of 41 municipal councillors; presumably with the endorsement of the 10 municipal councillors of Barcelona en Comú, along with the 8 municipal councillors of the PSC and 3 out 6 individual councillors of the Barcelona pel Canvi–Ciutadans list: Manuel Valls, Celestino Corbacho and Eva Parera), thus renewing her mandate as Mayor of Barcelona. However, her party lost the majority on the 28 May 2023 Barcelona municipal election.

In 2018, after a legal battle, she obtained the lifting of the Constitutional Court's veto on the expropriation of empty dwellings. More than 2,000 bank-owned homes that have been unoccupied for several years could be converted into social housing.

During her period as mayor of Barcelona, Colau has maintained a political stance against activities that are susceptible of contributing to greenhouse gas emissions and air pollution. She has repeatedly opposed the expansion of El Prat airport and the use of private cars in the city, and has pushed regional authorities to restrict the number of cruise ships arrivals in Barcelona. In 2020 she declared a "climate emergency", advocating limiting the consumption of meat at schools and forbidding councillors from using the Barcelona-Madrid air shuttle. Colau also called for a reduction of air traffic during the C40 Cities 2019 summit, arguing that aeroplanes generate greenhouse gas emissions that are "very dangerous for the planet".

Although Spanish municipalities have little power in the area of public health, which is usually the responsibility of the regions, Ada Colau's administration has made the mental health of residents, especially the youngest, one of its priorities. As soon as she came to power, she set up the 2016–2022 mental health plan, which included 170 initiatives and led, in particular, to the creation of various reception structures, the Konsulta'm. Some initiatives, such as the suicide prevention telephone number, have been adopted by the government on a national scale. Barcelona City Council has also signed a protocol with employers and trade unions to improve prevention in the workplace, developed a program to help young children develop their "emotional muscles" in schools, and opened crèches between 4.30 and 8 p.m. so that grandparents looking after their grandchildren can get together and help each other.

During both of her mandates she championed the idea of superilles (lit. 'superblocks', city blocks), consisting of a grouping of city blocks to create a bigger one with its interior streets pedestrianized, especially at Eixample and Sant Martí districts; the first iterations were deployed in the Sant Antoni neighborhood in 2016.

During her second mandate she kickstarted the union of the two tramway networks (Trambaix and Trambesòs) along Avinguda Diagonal, with the first section reaching Verdaguer (from Glòries) being opened in November 2024.

== Catalan independence and pro-Europeanism ==
Colau stated in 2016, "I've never been nationalist or pro-independence." Colau was originally against the referendum vote; however, a week before the actual vote, she stated a referendum could take place after sustained pressure from pro-independence forces. After the referendum of the 1-O, she embraced a central position rejecting both an UDI and the intervention in the Catalan self-government. She considers herself in the camp "committed to advancing towards a democratic, social and freedom-loving European project".

== Controversies and criticism ==
=== Alleged corruption scandals ===
Ada Colau was indicted by the Spanish judiciary in 2022, following a complaint from the Vauras fund, for alleged irregularities in the handing of subsidies to entities linked to her party Barcelona en Comú, including to the Platform for People Affected by Mortgages which she founded in 2009. Colau faced criticism because she refused to resign from her post as mayor, despite the ethical code of conduct of the party stating that party members pledge to resign from their posts should they be indicted for corruption, embezzlement or influence peddling, among other crimes. A judge later dismissed a case involving some of the charges pressed against her.

In November 2022, the Provincial Court of Barcelona reopened the case against her. The writ stated that there are indications of malfeasance in the repeated handing out of subsidies to organisations linked to Colau.

She was cleared in December 2023. The magistrate points to the fund Vauras for using a complaint against the former mayoress for "purposes unrelated to those of the criminal proceedings" because "the housing policies" promoted by the City Council "were not favorable to her".

=== Accusations of nepotism ===
In 2022, the Ethics and Conduct Committee of the Council of Barcelona produced a report in which it heavily criticised the decision to hire Alicia Ramos, partner of the Housing councillor, as an advisor to the staff of Ada Colau on grounds of a potential conflict of interest. The report also stated that Alicia Ramos was not hired following a competitive process, and that the authorities failed to provide any reasons as to why Ramos was suitable for the role. Colau has also been criticised for several other controversial hirings, such as that of her husband Adrià Alemany as an advisor to Barcelona en Comú, the party she leads. Adrià Alemany was, however, one of the party's founders.

=== Accusations about crime rates ===
Albert Batlle, the deputy mayor of Security of the Council of Barcelona, says in 2019 that the city was experiencing a "security crisis", while United States embassy in Spain soon issued a statement warning of violent crime in Barcelona. In September 2022 the police union of the Catalan autonomous police has accused Colau of "normalising" and "dehumanising" the rising number of crimes committed in Barcelona during her mayoralty after a 25-year-old man was fatally stabbed during La Mercè festivities.

== Support for Palestine ==
In September 2025, Ada Colau voiced her support for the Global Sumud Flotilla, a civil society initiative seeking to challenge the naval blockade of the Gaza Strip and to open a humanitarian corridor. Along with several other international personalities, Colau endorsed the flotilla’s objectives, referring to it as a "citizen-driven humanitarian effort" and calling for an end to the blockade of Gaza.

== Awards ==
- 2013 - Award for Human Rights, Barcelona Human Rights Film Festival
- 2013 - Award for Defenders of Social Rights, Colau Ada and Rafael Mayoral, representing the Plataforma de Afectados por la Hipoteca (PAH) (Platform for People Affected by Mortgages), for their continuing struggle for the legal right to a decent home, for their capacity to mobilize and citizen participation, and for their example of solidarity. Award from the media "Human Journalism".
- 2013 - European Citizens' Prize (with the PAH)
- 2013 - United Women Prize from the Artistas Intérpretes, Sociedad de Gestión (AISGE).

== Publications ==
=== Books ===
- 2012 - Ada Colau and Adria Alemany, Mortgaged Lives. Foreword by Gerardo Pisarello and José Coy, English Translation by Michelle Teran ISBN 978-09-791-3777-8
- 2013 - Ada Colau and Adria Alemany, Yes you can! Chronicle of a small great victory. Editorial Destino, Collection Imago Mundi, 19 April 2013, ISBN 978-84-233-4690-5, 96 pp.

=== Articles ===
- 2011 - Ada Colau, How to stop an eviction, Platform for People Affected by Mortgages (PAH), July 2011.
- 2014 - Ada Colau, Making the democratic revolution happen, Diario Público, 5 December 2014.
