= Plataforma de Afectados por la Hipoteca =

Spanish organization

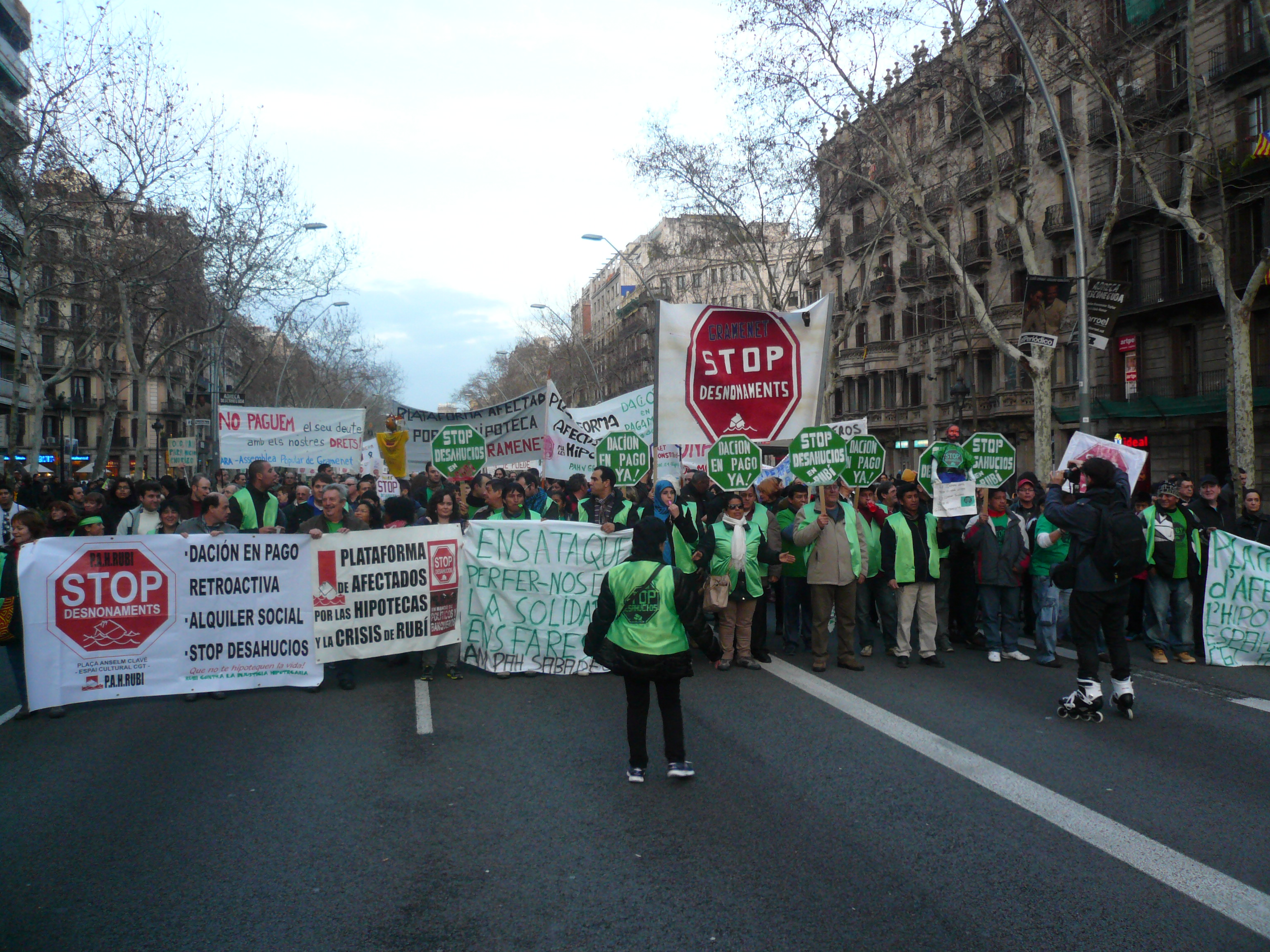
- Abbreviation: PAH
- Formation: 2009; 17 years ago
- Region served: Spain
- Website: afectadosporlahipoteca.com

Plataforma de Afectados por la Hipoteca (PAH; Platform for People Affected by Mortgages) is a Spanish grassroots organization that takes direct action to stop evictions and campaigns for housing rights. The PAH was set up in Barcelona in February 2009 and by 2017 had 220 local branches across Spain. It was established in response to the 2008 financial crisis that triggered the bursting of the Spanish housing bubble and resists evictions due to foreclosures.

== Activity and campaigns ==
The Plataforma de Afectados por la Hipoteca (PAH, Platform for People Affected by Mortgages) was set up in Barcelona in February 2009, by activists previously involved in V de Vivienda (H for Housing). The group aimed to protest and combat the foreclosures which were evicting people from their homes. It is organised horizontally by assembly and grew exponentially across Spain, with 220 local groups recorded by 2017. The group organises non-violent resistance to evictions and campaigns for a social rent and more aid for people unable to pay their mortgages. The PAH had successfully stopped more than 2,000 evictions by 2016.

Ada Colau was one of the founding members of the PAH, acting as its spokesperson until May 2014. Despite Colau later becoming Mayor of Barcelona from 2015 to 2023, PAH remains non-partisan and does not allow anyone affiliated with political parties or politicians to speak on their behalf.

PAH achieved notoriety for its practice of "escraches" in which the homes and offices of politicians were visited. Mariano Rajoy, the Spanish Prime Minister condemned escraches as "undemocratic" and María Dolores de Cospedal, Secretary-General of the People's Party called them "pure Nazism". A lawyer representing PAH commented "We don’t like to carry out escraches but they've left us with no other choice".

== Awards ==
In 2013, PAH received the Premio Nacional de Derechos Humanos, a national award for human rights. It also received the European Citizens' Prize.

== See also ==
- Subprime mortgage crisis
