= Arcadi Oliveres =

Spanish economist (1945–2021)

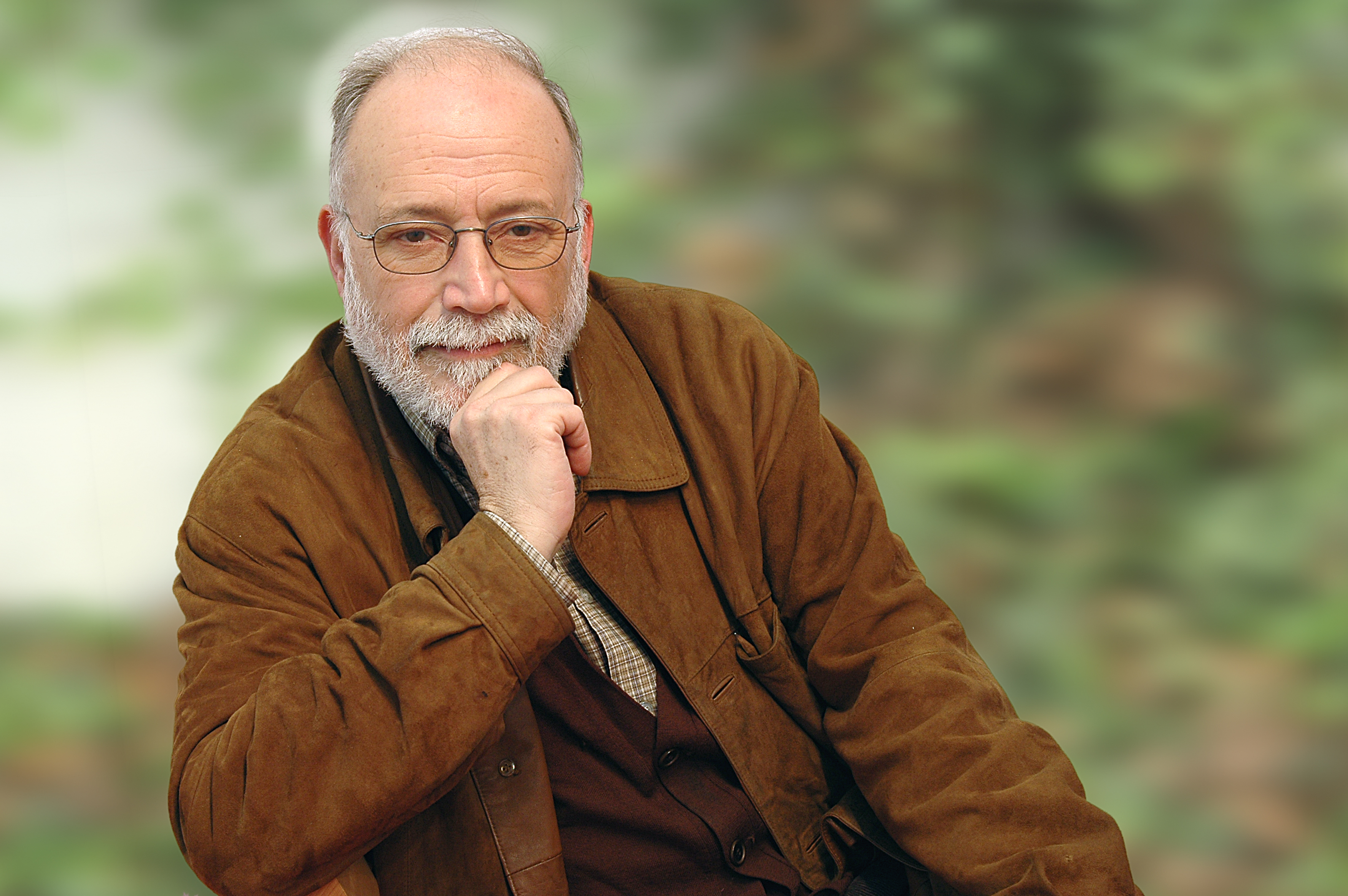
Oliveres in 2005

Arcadi Oliveres i Boadella (27 November 1945 – 6 April 2021) was a Spanish economist, academic, and social activist. He was president of "Justícia i Pau", a Christian peace group in Catalonia, and helped to promote its war tax resistance campaign.

== Biography ==
He graduated in economics in 1968 from the University of Barcelona. In 1993 he received his doctorate with a thesis on the cycle of defense economics and obtained a position as full professor in the Department of Applied Economics at the Autonomous University of Barcelona.

Already in his student days, still during the Franco dictatorship, he showed his commitment to democracy by participating in the clandestine assemblies of the Sindicat Democràtic d'Estudiants and in La Capuchinada of March 1966, as well as in the Assembly of Catalonia.

In 1974 he began to participate in the international Catholic organization Pax Christi, dedicated to the promotion of peace and reconciliation among peoples. In 1981 he joined the Associació Justícia i Pau de Barcelona, dedicated to the promotion of human rights and peace, an organization he chaired from 2001 until April 2014.

In 2013 he created, together with Teresa Forcades, a popular platform for the independence of Catalonia called Procés Constituent and to run in the Catalan elections.

He collaborated with the magazines Canigó and Serra d'Or, and with Diari de la Pau. He also participated in more than sixty books (monographs) and publications.

He died on April 6, 2021, at his home in Sant Cugat del Vallés, due to pancreatic cancer.
