= Jaume Collboni =

Spanish jurist, politician and lawyer

The Most Excellent Jaume Collboni
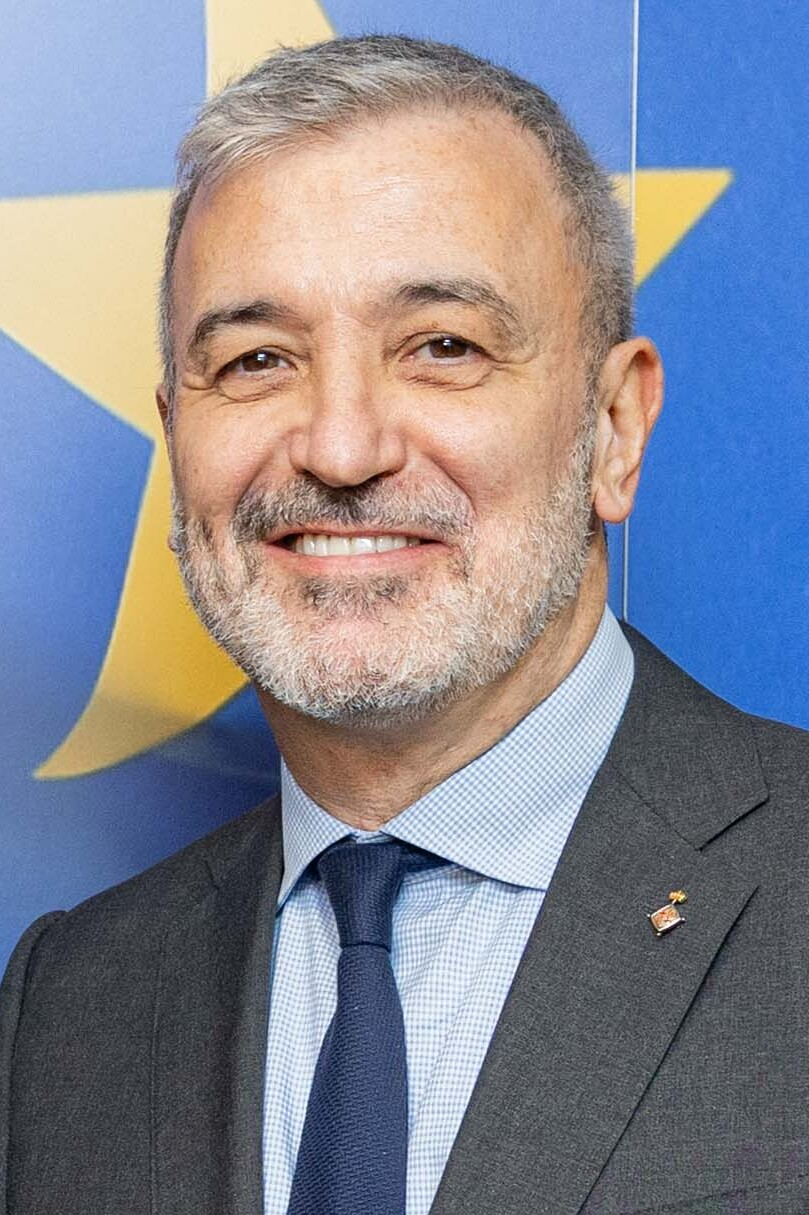
- Collboni in 2025

Mayor of Barcelona
- Incumbent
- Assumed office 17 June 2023
- First Deputy: Laia Bonet
- Preceded by: Ada Colau

First Deputy Mayor of Barcelona
- In office 15 June 2019 – 1 February 2023
- Mayor: Ada Colau
- Preceded by: Gerardo Pisarello
- Succeeded by: Laia Bonet

Member of the Parliament of Catalonia
- In office 16 December 2010 – 14 March 2014
- Succeeded by: Cristòfol Gimeno Iglesias
- Constituency: Barcelona

Member of the Barcelona City Council
- Incumbent
- Assumed office 17 June 2023
- In office 13 June 2015 – 1 February 2023
- Succeeded by: Núria Carmona

Personal details
- Born: Jaume Collboni Cuadrado; 5 September 1969 (age 56) Barcelona, Spain
- Party: Socialists' Party of Catalonia
- Spouse: Óscar Cornejo (m. 2011; div. 2016)

Jaume Collboni Cuadrado (Catalan pronunciation: [ˈʒawmə ˌkɔʎˈβɔni]; born 5 September 1969) is a Spanish politician, lawyer by profession, and civil servant of the local administration. He became the Mayor of Barcelona on 17 June 2023.

In 2010, he became a member of the Parliament of Catalonia, representing the province of Barcelona, and was appointed deputy spokesman in the Parliamentary Group of the Socialists. In November 2011, he was appointed Secretary of Communication and Spokesman of the PSC. Later, in 2014, he left his seat to run in the primary of the PSC for the mayoralty of Barcelona. Following these primaries, which he won, he was designated candidate for Mayor of Barcelona by the Party of the Socialists of Catalonia.

== Biography ==
=== Trade union career ===
He commenced his syndical activism in the assembly movement and, upon entering the Faculty of Law at the University of Barcelona, joined the Association of Young Students of Catalonia (AJEC) of which he ended up as general secretary from 1992 to 1995, a period in which he was a cloistral member of the University of Barcelona under the mandate of the rector, Dr. Bricall. In 1996, he promoted the creation of the Technical Cabinet of the UGT (General Workers' Union) of Catalonia, of which he formed part of the National Management of the union from 1998 to 2005, developing tasks in the fields of communication, culture, international relations and cooperation. During the same period, he was one of the founders of the Centre for Economic and Social Research of Catalonia (CRESC). Between 2001 and 2005, he was a councillor for trade union representation of the Economic and Social Council of Spain.

=== Political career ===
Jaume Collboni joined the Party of the Socialists of Catalonia in the year 1994. Two years later he was chosen spokesman of the district of Horta-Guinardó, a position he held until 1999. Between the years 2005 and 2010, he assumed the coordination of the Socialist Parliamentary Group in the Parliament of Catalonia. Since 2008 he has also belonged to the party executive. In December 2011, during the Twelfth Congress of the PSC, he was appointed Secretary of Communication and Spokesman for the party. In 2010 he was director of the election campaign of the PSC for the regional elections and, from this same year, he was a member of the Parliament of Catalonia and deputy spokesman for the parliamentary group of the socialists and spokesperson for the Committee on Business and Employment. He was chairman of the committee on the electoral law of Catalonia, and in turn, of the committee for the law on transparency and access to public information.

In 2014 he stood as a candidate in the primary, organised by the PSC, to be chosen as mayoral candidate for the city of Barcelona. He competed against fellow party members Carmen Andrés, Jordi Martí, Laia Bonet and Rocío Martínez-Sampere. Taking place in Ciudad Condal on 29 March 2014, the primary saw a first round in which Collboni and Andrés were the most voted candidates, who subsequently went forward to a run-off. In both rounds, Jaume Collboni was the most voted candidate.

On 17 June 2023, following the May 2023 municipal election, an absolute majority (23 out of 41 councillors) of the constituent plenary of the new municipal corporation invested Collboni as Mayor of Barcelona. In his speech after being elected, he proclaimed the three pillars of the incoming government to be economic promotion of the city and jobs, public services and loyalty to Catalan, Spanish and European institutions, otherwise underscoring housing as the "main challenge" of the city.

One of the first significant measures of the new mayor was to normalize relations with the Crown, being received by King Felipe VI at Palace of Albéniz, an event that had not occurred for 17 years, when in 2006 King Juan Carlos I received Joan Clos at the Palace of Zarzuela. In June 2024, Collboni announced that Barcelona's government would not extend the licences of 10,101 apartments that are listed as short-term rentals and would not allow tourists to rent apartments, in an effort to solve the housing crisis.

== Personal life ==
Openly gay, Collboni married the television producer Óscar Cornejo in 2011. The couple separated five years later.

== Political and institutional offices ==
- 1998–2005: Member of the National Executive Council of the UGT
- 2001–2005: Councillor for trade union representation at the Economic and Social Council of Spain
- 1999–2003: PSC Spokesman in the District of Horta-Guinardó
- 2005–2010: Coordinator of the parliamentary group of the socialists in the Parliament of Catalonia
- 2008 – Member of the executive of the PSC
- 2010 – Member of the Parliament of Catalonia and deputy spokesman of the Parliamentary Group
- 2011 – Secretary of Communication and spokesman for the PSC
- 2012 – Spokesman of the Socialist Group in the Parliament of Catalonia
- 2014 – President of the Barcelona Federation of the PSC.
- 2015 – Member of Barcelona City Council
- 2019 – Deputy Mayor of Barcelona
- 2023 – Mayor of Barcelona
