= 1999 Barcelona municipal election =

Election in the Spanish municipality of Barcelona

- 13 June 1999

All 41 seats in the City Council of Barcelona 21 seats needed for a majority
- Opinion polls
- Registered: 1,352,781 ▼1.1%
- Turnout: 697,091 (51.5%) ▼14.7 pp
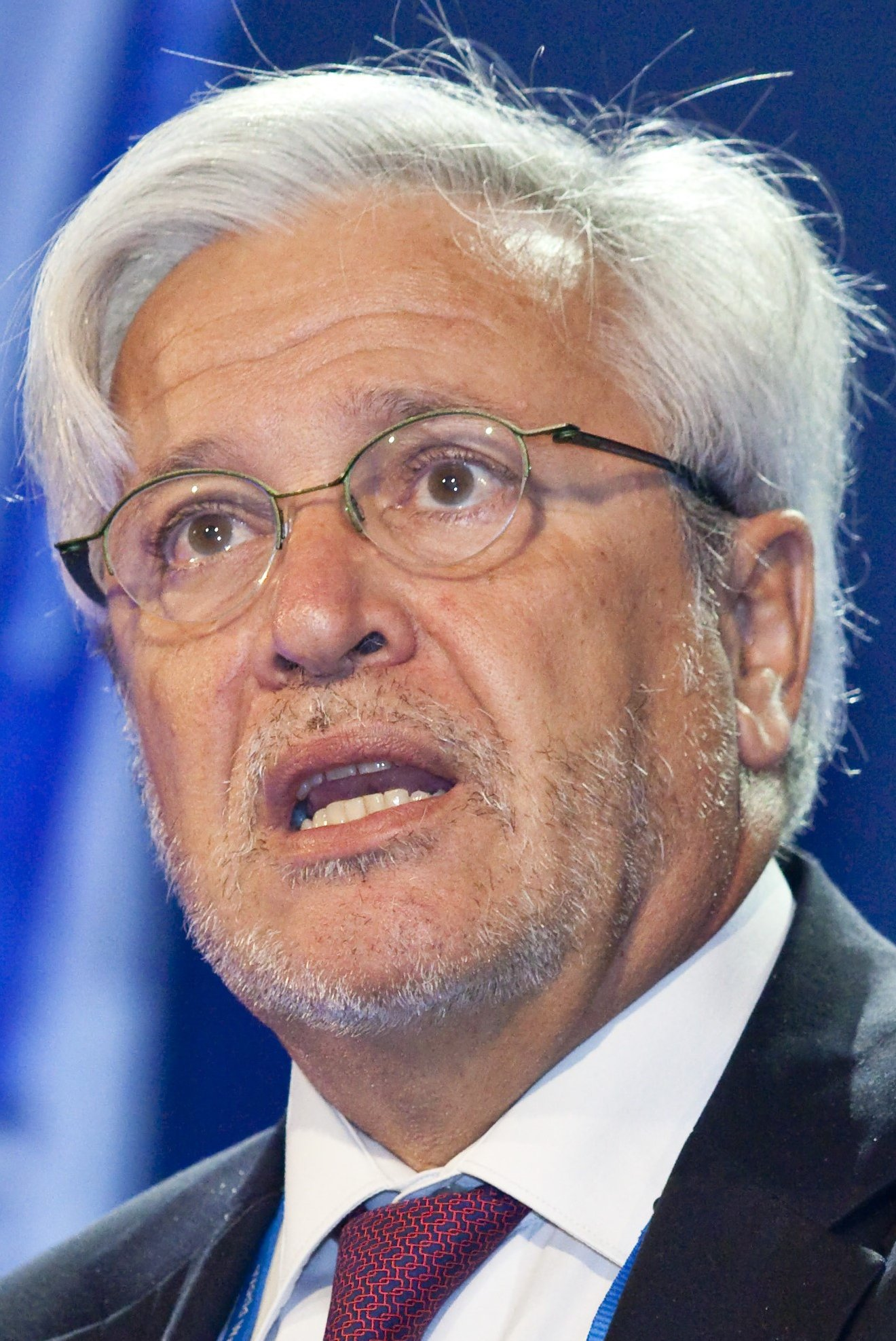

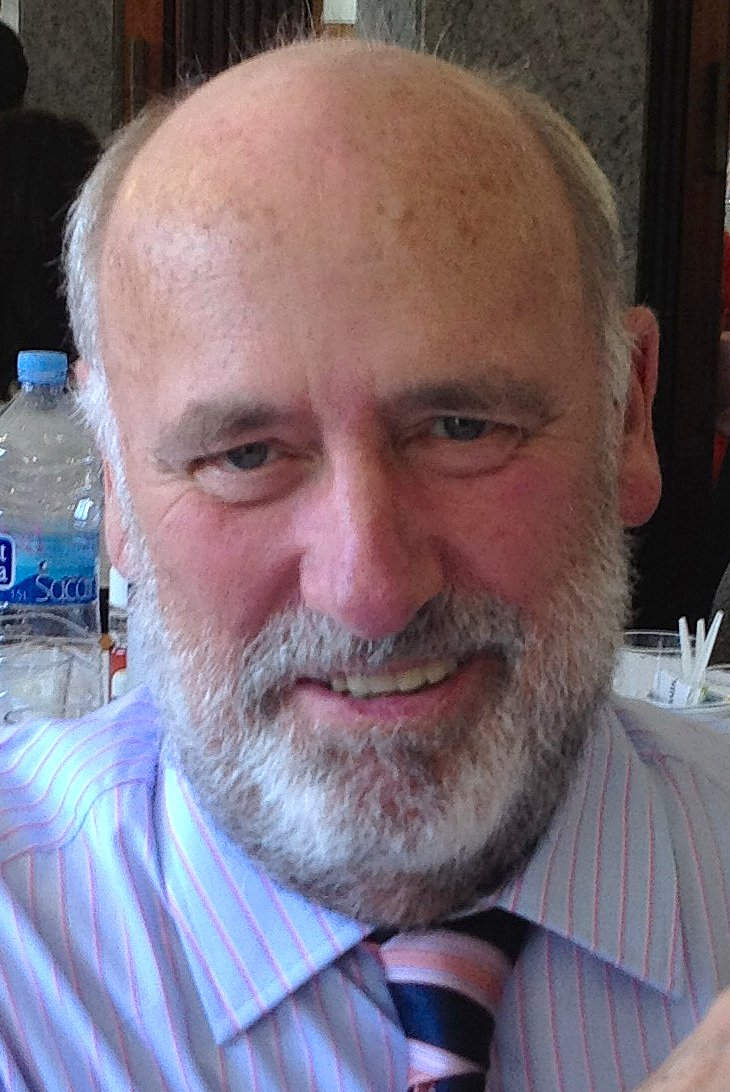

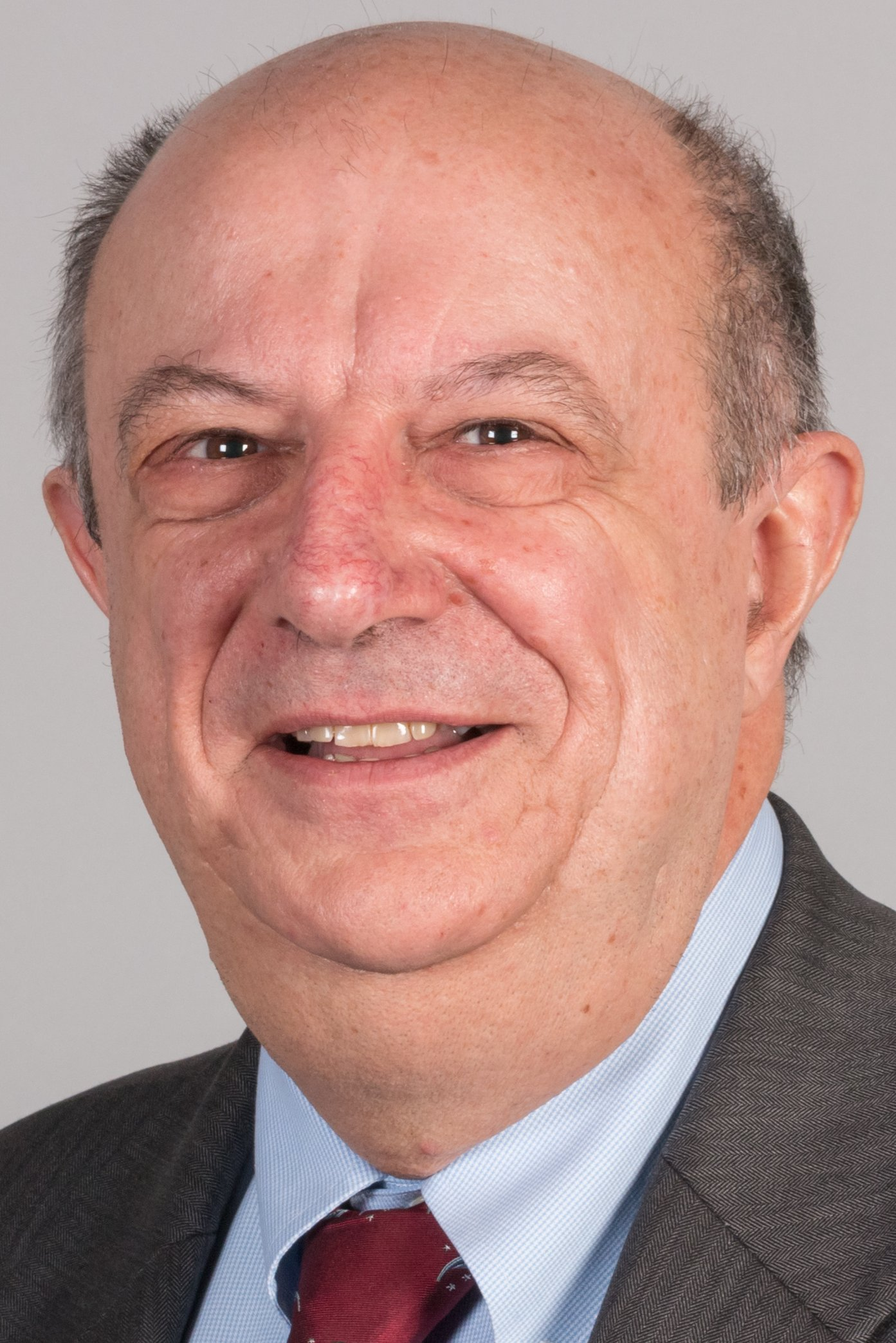

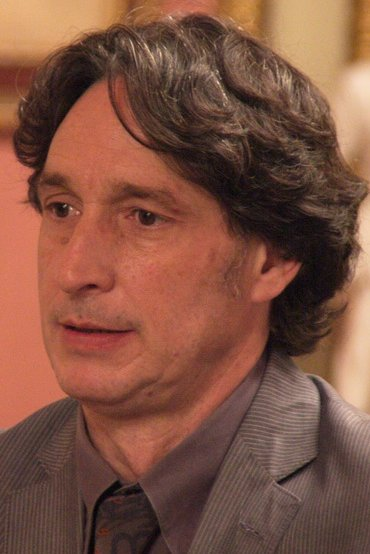

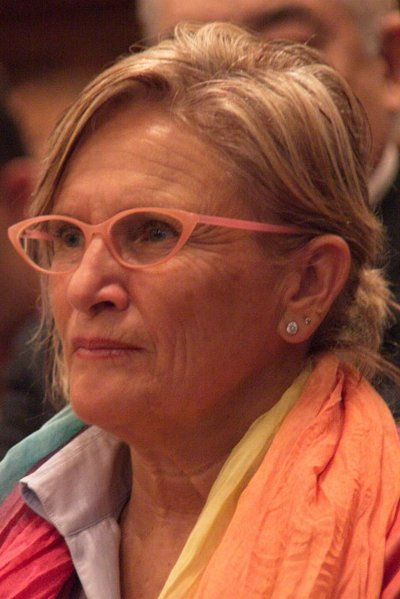
	First party	Second party	Third party
Leader	Joan Clos	Joaquim Molins	Santiago Fisas
Party	PSC–PM	CiU	PP
Leader since	26 September 1997	30 March 1998	22 January 1999
Last election	16 seats, 38.4%	13 seats, 30.6%	7 seats, 16.6%
Seats won	20	10	6
Seat change	▲4	▼3	▼1
Popular vote	313,623	150,518	103,177
Percentage	45.2%	21.7%	14.9%
Swing	▲6.8 pp	▼8.9 pp	▼1.7 pp
	Fourth party	Fifth party
Leader	Jordi Portabella	Imma Mayol
Party	ERC–EV–AM	IC–V–EPM
Leader since	16 May 1998	1998
Last election	2 seats, 5.1%	3 seats (IC–EV) (Note: Within the IC–EV alliance in the 1995 election.)
Seats won	3	2
Seat change	▲1	▼1
Popular vote	45,278	43,999
Percentage	6.5%	6.3%
Swing	▲1.4 pp	n/a
Mayor before election
Joan Clos
PSC
Mayor after election
Joan Clos
PSC

A municipal election was held in Barcelona on 13 June 1999 to elect the 6th City Council of the municipality. All 41 seats in the City Council were up for election. It was held concurrently with regional elections in thirteen autonomous communities and local elections all across Spain, as well as the 1999 European Parliament election.

== Overview ==
Under the 1978 Constitution, the governance of municipalities in Spain—part of the country's local government system—was centered on the figure of city councils (Spanish: ayuntamientos), local corporations with independent legal personality composed of a mayor, a government council and an elected legislative assembly. The mayor was indirectly elected by the local assembly, requiring an absolute majority; otherwise, the candidate from the most-voted party automatically became mayor (ties were resolved by drawing lots). In the case of Barcelona, the top-tier administrative and governing body was the City Council of Barcelona.

=== Date ===
The term of local assemblies in Spain expired four years after the date of their previous election, with election day being fixed for the fourth Sunday of May every four years, but a 1998 amendment allowed for local elections held in May 1995 to be held concurrently with European Parliament elections, provided that they were scheduled for within a four month-timespan. The election decree was required to be issued no later than 54 days before the scheduled election date and published on the following day in the Official State Gazette (BOE). The previous local elections were held on 28 May 1995, setting the date for election day concurrently with that year's European Parliament election on 13 June 1999.

Local assemblies could not be dissolved before the expiration of their term, except in cases of mismanagement that seriously harmed the public interest and implied a breach of constitutional obligations, in which case the Council of Ministers could—optionally—decide to call a by-election.

Elections to the assemblies of local entities were officially called on 20 April 1999 with the publication of the corresponding decree in the BOE, setting election day for 13 June.

=== Electoral system ===
Voting for local assemblies was based on universal suffrage, comprising all Spanish nationals over 18 years of age, registered and residing in the municipality and with full political rights (provided that they had not been deprived of the right to vote by a final sentence, nor were legally incapacitated), as well as resident non-national European citizens, and those whose country of origin allowed reciprocal voting by virtue of a treaty.

Local councillors were elected using the D'Hondt method and closed-list proportional voting, with a five percent-threshold of valid votes (including blank ballots) in each municipality. Each municipality was a multi-member constituency, with a number of seats based on the following scale:

Population	Councillors
<250	5
251–1,000	7
1,001–2,000	9
2,001–5,000	11
5,001–10,000	13
10,001–20,000	17
20,001–50,000	21
50,001–100,000	25
>100,001	+1 per each 100,000 inhabitants or fraction +1 if total is an even number

The law did not provide for by-elections to fill vacant seats; instead, any vacancies arising after the proclamation of candidates and during the legislative term were filled by the next candidates on the party lists or, when required, by designated substitutes.

== Parties and candidates ==
The electoral law allowed for parties and federations registered in the interior ministry, alliances and groupings of electors to present lists of candidates. Parties and federations intending to form an alliance were required to inform the relevant electoral commission within 10 days of the election call, whereas groupings of electors needed to secure the signature of a determined amount of the electors registered in the municipality for which they sought election, disallowing electors from signing for more than one list. In the case of Barcelona, as its population was over 1,000,001, at least 8,000 signatures were required.

Below is a list of the main parties and alliances which contested the election:

Candidacy	Parties and alliances	Leading candidate	Ideology	Previous result		Gov.	Ref.
Candidacy	Parties and alliances	Leading candidate	Ideology	Vote %	Seats	Gov.	Ref.
PSC–PM	List: Socialists' Party of Catalonia (PSC–PSOE)	Joan Clos	Social democracy	38.4%	16	Yes	
CiU	List: Democratic Convergence of Catalonia (CDC); Democratic Union of Catalonia (UDC)	Joaquim Molins	Catalan nationalism Centrism	30.6%	13	No	
PP	List: People's Party (PP)	Santiago Fisas	Conservatism; Christian democracy	16.6%	7	No	
IC– V–EPM	List: Initiative for Catalonia–Greens (IC–V)	Imma Mayol	Regionalism; Eco-socialism; Green politics	7.6% (Note: Results for IC–EV in the 1995 election.)	3	Yes	
EUiA	List: United and Alternative Left (EUiA) – Living Unified Socialist Party of Catalonia (PSUC viu) – Party of the Communists of Catalonia (PCC)	Jordi Gasull	Socialism; Communism	7.6%	3	No	
ERC– EV–AM	List: Republican Left of Catalonia (ERC); The Greens–Ecologist Confederation of Catalonia (EV–CEC)	Jordi Portabella	Catalan independence Left-wing nationalism Social democracy	5.1%	2	No	
PI	List: Party for Independence (PI)	Pilar Rahola	Catalan independence	Did not contest		Yes	

== Opinion polls ==
The tables below list opinion polling results in reverse chronological order, showing the most recent first and using the dates when the survey fieldwork was done, as opposed to the date of publication. Where the fieldwork dates are unknown, the date of publication is given instead. The highest percentage figure in each polling survey is displayed with its background shaded in the leading party's colour. If a tie ensues, this is applied to the figures with the highest percentages. The "Lead" column on the right shows the percentage-point difference between the parties with the highest percentages in a poll.

=== Voting intention estimates ===
The table below lists weighted voting intention estimates. Refusals are generally excluded from the party vote percentages, while question wording and the treatment of "don't know" responses and those not intending to vote may vary between polling organisations. When available, seat projections determined by the polling organisations are displayed below (or in place of) the percentages in a smaller font; 21 seats were required for an absolute majority in the City Council of Barcelona.

Polling firm/Commissioner	Fieldwork date	Sample size	Turnout	PSC	CiU	PP	IC–V	ERC	PI	EUiA	Lead
1999 municipal election	13 Jun 1999	—N/a	51.5	45.2; 20	21.7; 10	14.9; 6	6.3; 2	6.5; 3	1.0; 0	1.3; 0	23.5
DYM/El Periódico	6 Jun 1999	1,007	?	44.1; 20	31.5; 14	12.8; 5	5.5; 2	3.3; 0	–	–	12.6
Opina/La Vanguardia	1–2 Jun 1999	900	?	40.0; 18/19	26.5; 12	17.5; 7/8	5.0; 0/2	6.0; 2	–	–	13.5
Eco Consulting/ABC	24 May–2 Jun 1999	400	?	35.8; 16/17	28.8; 13	18.9; 8/9	7.0; 3	–	4.2; 0	2.1; 0	7.0
Sigma Dos/El Mundo	27 May–1 Jun 1999	500	?	39.2; 17/19	27.3; 12/13	18.5; 8/9	5.5; 2	4.4; 0	2.1; 0	1.8; 0	11.9
Demoscopia/El País	26 May–1 Jun 1999	?	?	39.9; 17/18	25.3; 11	19.3; 8/9	8.1; 3	4.7; 0/2	–	–	14.6
CIS	9–19 May 1999	720	?	41.6; 17/18	27.0; 11/12	16.3; 6/7	7.0; 2/3	5.6; 2	0.4; 0	–	14.6
Opina/La Vanguardia	29 Apr–1 May 1999	850	?	39.0; 17/19	30.0; 13/14	17.0; 7/8	5.0; 0/2	5.0; 0/2	0.5; 0	1.0; 0	9.0
DYM/El Periódico	24 Apr 1999	708	?	42.7; 19/20	26.9; 12	15.0; 6/7	3.8; 0	6.2; 2	0.4; 0	4.8; 0/2	15.8
Opina/La Vanguardia	19–20 Jun 1998	600	?	38.1; 17	30.8; 14	16.3; 7	6.0; 3	4.8; 0	1.0; 0	0.8; 0	7.3
IC–EV	20–22 Apr 1998	1,200	?	? 18	? 13	? 7	? 3	? 0	? 0	–	?
Barcelona City Council	15–17 Dec 1997	720	?	41.0– 42.0; 19	29.5– 30.5; 13	? 7	? 2	? 0	? 0	–	11.5
1996 general election	3 Mar 1996	—N/a	77.0	34.4 (15)	29.8 (13)	22.7 (10)	7.7 (3)	4.1 (0)	–	–	4.6
1995 regional election	19 Nov 1995	—N/a	65.9	21.5 (9)	39.7 (17)	17.6 (7)	9.9 (4)	9.3 (4)	–	–	18.2
1995 municipal election	28 May 1995	—N/a	66.2	38.4; 16	30.6; 13	16.6; 7	7.6; 3	5.1; 2	–	–	7.8

=== Voting preferences ===
The table below lists raw, unweighted voting preferences.

Polling firm/Commissioner	Fieldwork date	Sample size	PSC	CiU	PP	IC–V	ERC	PI	EUiA	Question	X mark	Lead
1999 municipal election	13 Jun 1999	—N/a	23.2	11.1	7.6	3.3	3.3	0.5	0.7	—N/a	48.5	12.1
CIS	9–19 May 1999	720	29.2	14.0	7.5	6.4	4.3	0.3	–	27.0	9.5	15.2
1996 general election (Note: Does not include non-resident citizens.)	3 Mar 1996	—N/a	26.4	22.9	17.4	5.9	3.2	–	–	—N/a	23.0	3.5
1995 regional election	19 Nov 1995	—N/a	14.2	26.1	11.6	6.5	6.1	–	–	—N/a	34.1	11.9
1995 municipal election	28 May 1995	—N/a	25.4	20.2	11.0	5.0	3.4	–	–	—N/a	33.8	5.2

=== Victory preferences ===
The table below lists opinion polling on the victory preferences for each party in the event of a municipal election taking place.

Polling firm/Commissioner	Fieldwork date	Sample size	PSC	CiU	PP	IC–V	ERC	PI	EUiA	Other/ None	Question	Lead
CIS	9–19 May 1999	720	38.2	15.6	7.5	7.5	4.2	0.3	–	0.7	26.0	22.6
Opina/La Vanguardia	29 Apr–1 May 1999	850	38.1	22.4	4.1	2.7	2.2	–	0.2	0.9	29.4	15.7
Opina/La Vanguardia	19–20 Jun 1998	600	36.0	24.8	–	–	–	–	–	7.5	31.7	11.2

=== Victory likelihood ===
The table below lists opinion polling on the perceived likelihood of victory for each party in the event of a municipal election taking place.

Polling firm/Commissioner	Fieldwork date	Sample size	PSC	CiU	PP	IC–V	ERC	EUiA	Other/ None	Question	Lead
CIS	9–19 May 1999	720	61.5	10.7	3.6	0.4	–	–	–	23.7	50.8
Opina/La Vanguardia	29 Apr–1 May 1999	850	51.7	14.4	1.5	0.2	0.4	0.0	0.0	32.1	37.3
Opina/La Vanguardia	19–20 Jun 1998	600	46.7	19.8	–	–	–	–	1.3	32.2	26.9

=== Preferred Mayor ===
The table below lists opinion polling on leader preferences to become mayor of Barcelona.

All candidates

Polling firm/Commissioner	Fieldwork date	Sample size							Other/ None/ Not care	Question	Lead
Polling firm/Commissioner	Fieldwork date	Sample size	Clos PSC	Molins CiU	Fisas PP	Portabella ERC	Mayol IC–V	Rahola PI	Other/ None/ Not care	Question	Lead
CIS	9–19 May 1999	720	44.4	12.8	2.4	2.5	4.9	4.6	5.3	23.2	31.6

Clos vs. Molins

Polling firm/Commissioner	Fieldwork date	Sample size			Other/ None/ Not care	Question	Lead
Polling firm/Commissioner	Fieldwork date	Sample size	Clos PSC	Molins CiU	Other/ None/ Not care	Question	Lead
Opina/La Vanguardia	29 Apr–1 May 1999	850 (Note: Prompted.)	45.9	23.3	11.9	18.9	22.6
Opina/La Vanguardia	29 Apr–1 May 1999	850	39.9	20.7	11.4	28.0	19.2
Opina/La Vanguardia	19–20 Jun 1998	600	40.2	20.2	8.5	31.1	20.0

=== Predicted Mayor ===
The table below lists opinion polling on the perceived likelihood for each leader to become mayor.

Polling firm/Commissioner	Fieldwork date	Sample size			Other/ None/ Not care	Question	Lead
Polling firm/Commissioner	Fieldwork date	Sample size	Clos PSC	Molins CiU	Other/ None/ Not care	Question	Lead
Opina/La Vanguardia	29 Apr–1 May 1999	850	57.2	12.1	1.9	28.8	45.1
Opina/La Vanguardia	19–20 Jun 1998	600	50.3	14.7	3.0	32.0	35.6

== Results ==
← Summary of the 13 June 1999 City Council of Barcelona election results →
Parties and alliances	Popular vote			Seats	
Parties and alliances	Votes	%	±pp	Total	+/−
Socialists' Party of Catalonia–Municipal Progress (PSC–PM)	313,623	45.19	+6.80	20	+4
Convergence and Union (CiU)	150,518	21.69	−8.87	10	−3
People's Party (PP)	103,177	14.87	−1.75	6	−1
Republican Left of Catalonia–The Greens–Municipal Agreement (ERC–EV–AM)	45,278	6.52	+1.40	3	+1
Initiative for Catalonia–Greens–Agreement for Municipal Progress (IC–V–EPM)	43,999	6.34	−1.27	2	−1
United and Alternative Left (EUiA)	8,941	1.29	New	0	±0
Party for Independence (PI)	6,671	0.96	New	0	±0
The Greens–Green Group (EV–GV)	4,675	0.67	New	0	±0
Ecologist Party of Catalonia (PEC)	1,079	0.16	New	0	±0
Democratic and Social Centre (CDS)	798	0.11	−0.03	0	±0
The Phalanx (FE)	644	0.09	New	0	±0
Catalan State (EC)	561	0.08	New	0	±0
Humanist Party of Catalonia (PHC)	517	0.07	+0.04	0	±0
Independent Spanish Phalanx (FEI)	235	0.03	New	0	±0
European Nation State (N)	210	0.03	+0.01	0	±0
Blank ballots	13,130	1.89	+0.98		
Total	694,056			41	±0
Valid votes	694,056	99.56	−0.22		
Invalid votes	3,035	0.44	+0.22		
Votes cast / turnout	697,091	51.53	−14.69		
Abstentions	655,690	48.47	+14.69		
Registered voters	1,352,781				

Popular vote
PSC–PM	45.19%
CiU	21.69%
PP	14.87%
ERC–EV–AM	6.52%
IC–V–EPM	6.34%
EUiA	1.29%
Others	2.22%
Blank ballots	1.89%

Seats
PSC–PM	48.78%
CiU	24.39%
PP	14.63%
ERC–EV–AM	7.32%
IC–V–EPM	4.88%

== Aftermath ==
=== Government formation ===
Investiture
Ballot →	3 July 1999	
Required majority →	21 out of 41	
Joan Clos (PSC): • PSC (20); • ERC–EV (3); • IC–V (2)	25 / 41	check
Joaquim Molins (CiU): • CiU (10)	10 / 41	X mark
Santiago Fisas (PP): • PP (6)	6 / 41	X mark
Abstentions/Blank ballots	0 / 41	
Absentees	0 / 41	

== Bibliography ==
- Decreto 1166/1960, de 23 de mayo, por el que se establece un régimen especial para el Municipio de Barcelona, conforme a lo autorizado por el artículo 94 de la vigente Ley de Régimen Local (PDF) (Decree 1166/1960). Official State Gazette (in Spanish). 23 May 1960. BOE-A-1960-9155.
- Constitución Española (Constitution). Official State Gazette (in Spanish). 27 December 1978 [version as of 28 August 1992]. BOE-A-1978-31229.
- Ley 7/1985, de 2 de abril, Reguladora de las Bases del Régimen Local (Law 7/1985). Official State Gazette (in Spanish). 2 April 1985 [version as of 22 April 1999]. BOE-A-1985-5392.
- Ley Orgánica 5/1985, de 19 de junio, del Régimen Electoral General (Organic Law 5/1985). Official State Gazette (in Spanish). 19 June 1985 [version as of 22 April 1999]. BOE-A-1985-11672.
- Real Decreto 606/1999, de 19 de abril, de convocatoria de elecciones Locales y a las Asambleas de Ceuta y Melilla (Royal Decree 606/1999). Official State Gazette (in Spanish). 19 April 1999. BOE-A-1999-8719.
