= 1995 Barcelona municipal election =

Election in the Spanish municipality of Barcelona

- 28 May 1995

All 41 seats in the City Council of Barcelona 21 seats needed for a majority
- Opinion polls
- Registered: 1,368,148 ▼0.9%
- Turnout: 906,038 (66.2%) ▲10.7 pp
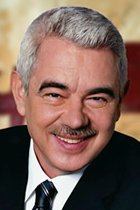

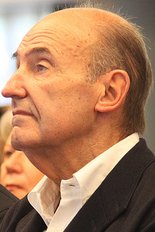

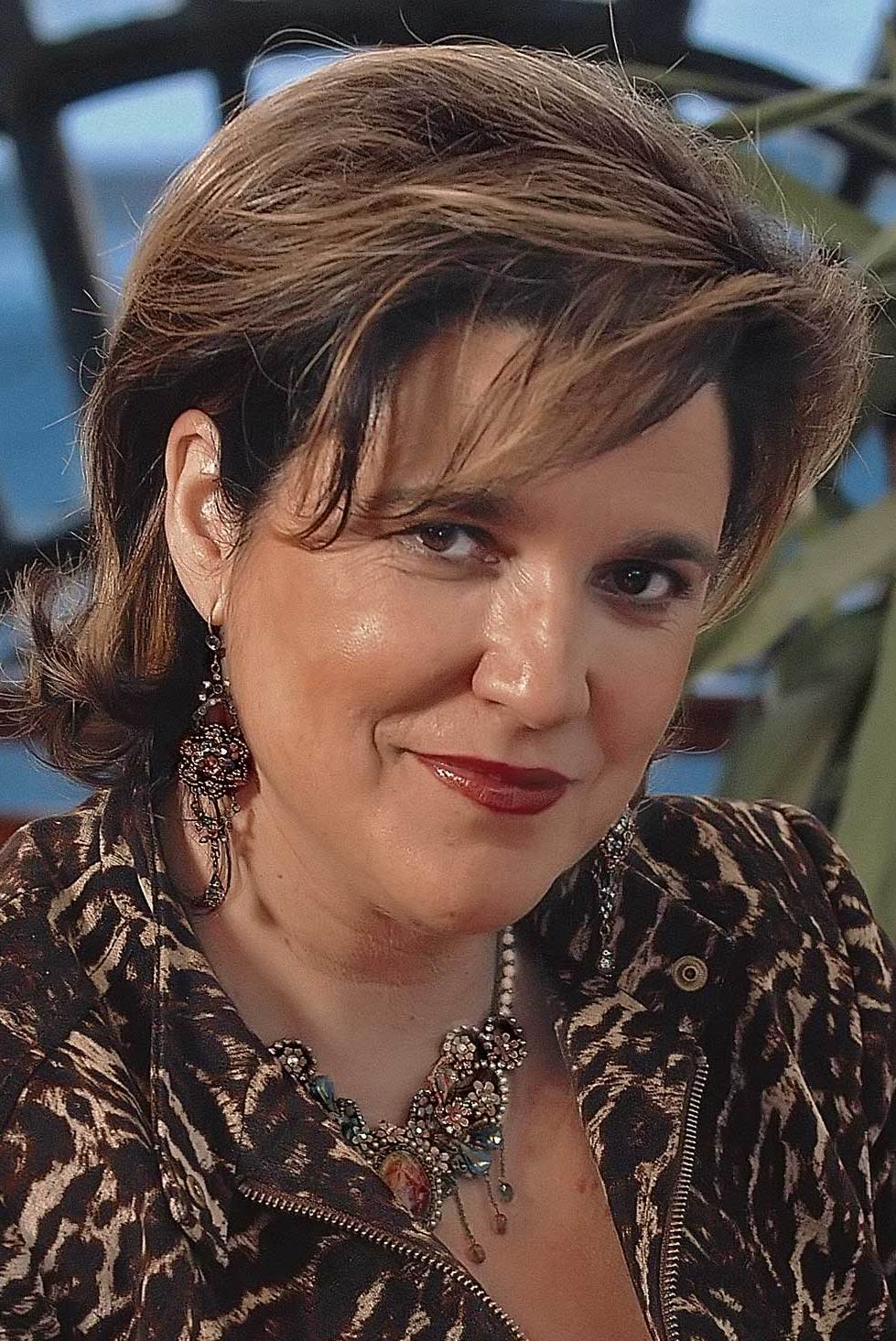
	First party	Second party	Third party
Leader	Pasqual Maragall	Miquel Roca	Enrique Lacalle
Party	PSC–PSOE	CiU	PP
Leader since	2 December 1982	7 July 1994	1987
Last election	20 seats, 42.9%	16 seats, 34.1%	4 seats, 9.8%
Seats won	16	13	7
Seat change	▼4	▼3	▲3
Popular vote	347,083	276,276	150,284
Percentage	38.4%	30.6%	16.6%
Swing	▼4.5 pp	▼3.5 pp	▲6.8 pp
	Fourth party	Fifth party
Leader	Eulàlia Vintró	Pilar Rahola
Party	IC–EV	ERC
Leader since	1987	11 March 1995
Last election	3 seats, 7.6% (Note: Results for IC (6.4%, 3 seats), BV (0.8%, 0 seats) and PCC (0.4%, 0 seats) in the 1991 election.)	0 seats, 2.6%
Seats won	3	2
Seat change	0	▲2
Popular vote	68,813	46,272
Percentage	7.6%	5.1%
Swing	▲1.2 pp	▲2.5 pp
Mayor before election
Pasqual Maragall
PSC
Mayor after election
Pasqual Maragall
PSC

A municipal election was held in Barcelona on 28 May 1995 to elect the 5th City Council of the municipality. All 41 seats in the City Council were up for election. It was held concurrently with regional elections in thirteen autonomous communities and local elections all across Spain.

The unveiling of numerous corruption scandals throughout 1994 affecting Felipe González's Socialist government marked the electoral campaign. For the first time in 16 years, a real possibility for change in the local government resulted in a heated race between Socialists' Party of Catalonia (PSC) candidate and incumbent Mayor Pasqual Maragall and Convergence and Union (CiU) candidate Miquel Roca. Another factors influencing the political debate were the People's Party (PP) rise in opinion polls as well as Republican Left of Catalonia (ERC) recovery.

The election resulted in a surprising comfortable win for PSC and Pasqual Maragall, which was elected for a fourth consecutive term in office with 16 seats and 38.4%. On the other hand, CiU suffered from the PP growth and obtained its worst result since 1983, winning 13 seats and 30.6%. The People's Party nearly doubled its 1991 result with 7 seats and 16.6%, while both Initiative for Catalonia (IC) and ERC improved their electoral performances, with the latter narrowly surpassing the 5% threshold to enter the City Council.

== Overview ==
Under the 1978 Constitution, the governance of municipalities in Spain—part of the country's local government system—was centered on the figure of city councils (Spanish: ayuntamientos), local corporations with independent legal personality composed of a mayor, a government council and an elected legislative assembly. The mayor was indirectly elected by the local assembly, requiring an absolute majority; otherwise, the candidate from the most-voted party automatically became mayor (ties were resolved by drawing lots). In the case of Barcelona, the top-tier administrative and governing body was the City Council of Barcelona.

=== Date ===
The term of local assemblies in Spain expired four years after the date of their previous election, with election day being fixed for the fourth Sunday of May every four years. The election decree was required to be issued no later than 54 days before the scheduled election date and published on the following day in the Official State Gazette (BOE). The previous local elections were held on 26 May 1991, setting the date for election day on the fourth Sunday of May four years later, which was 28 May 1995.

Local assemblies could not be dissolved before the expiration of their term, except in cases of mismanagement that seriously harmed the public interest and implied a breach of constitutional obligations, in which case the Council of Ministers could—optionally—decide to call a by-election.

Elections to the assemblies of local entities were officially called on 4 April 1995 with the publication of the corresponding decree in the BOE, setting election day for 28 May.

=== Electoral system ===
Voting for local assemblies was based on universal suffrage, comprising all Spanish nationals over 18 years of age, registered and residing in the municipality and with full political rights (provided that they had not been deprived of the right to vote by a final sentence, nor were legally incapacitated), as well as resident non-nationals whose country of origin allowed reciprocal voting by virtue of a treaty or within the framework of Community Law.

Local councillors were elected using the D'Hondt method and closed-list proportional voting, with a five percent-threshold of valid votes (including blank ballots) in each municipality. Each municipality was a multi-member constituency, with a number of seats based on the following scale:

Population	Councillors
<250	5
251–1,000	7
1,001–2,000	9
2,001–5,000	11
5,001–10,000	13
10,001–20,000	17
20,001–50,000	21
50,001–100,000	25
>100,001	+1 per each 100,000 inhabitants or fraction +1 if total is an even number

The law did not provide for by-elections to fill vacant seats; instead, any vacancies arising after the proclamation of candidates and during the legislative term were filled by the next candidates on the party lists or, when required, by designated substitutes.

== Parties and candidates ==
The electoral law allowed for parties and federations registered in the interior ministry, alliances and groupings of electors to present lists of candidates. Parties and federations intending to form an alliance were required to inform the relevant electoral commission within 10 days of the election call, whereas groupings of electors needed to secure the signature of a determined amount of the electors registered in the municipality for which they sought election, disallowing electors from signing for more than one list. In the case of Barcelona, as its population was over 1,000,001, at least 8,000 signatures were required.

Below is a list of the main parties and alliances which contested the election:

Candidacy	Parties and alliances	Leading candidate	Ideology	Previous result		Gov.	Ref.
Candidacy	Parties and alliances	Leading candidate	Ideology	Vote %	Seats	Gov.	Ref.
PSC–PSOE	List: Socialists' Party of Catalonia (PSC–PSOE)	Pasqual Maragall	Social democracy	42.9%	20	Yes	
CiU	List: Democratic Convergence of Catalonia (CDC); Democratic Union of Catalonia (UDC)	Miquel Roca	Catalan nationalism Centrism	34.1%	16	No	
PP	List: People's Party (PP)	Enrique Lacalle	Conservatism; Christian democracy	9.8%	4	No	
IC–EV	List: Initiative for Catalonia (IC) – Unified Socialist Party of Catalonia (PSUC) – Party of the Communists of Catalonia (PCC); The Greens–Ecologist Confederation of Catalonia (EV–CEC)	Eulàlia Vintró	Eco-socialism; Green politics	7.6%	3	Yes	
ERC	List: Republican Left of Catalonia (ERC)	Pilar Rahola	Catalan independence Left-wing nationalism Social democracy	2.6%	0	No	

== Campaign ==
=== Debates ===
1995 Barcelona municipal election debates
Date	Organizer(s)	Moderator(s)	P Present (Note: Denotes a main invitee attending the event.) S Surrogate (Note: Denotes a main invitee not attending the event, sending a surrogate in their place.) NI Not invited I Invited A Absent invitee			
Date	Organizer(s)	Moderator(s)	PSC	CiU	Audience	Ref.
22 May	Antena 3	Manuel Campo Vidal	P Maragall	P Roca		

== Opinion polls ==
The tables below list opinion polling results in reverse chronological order, showing the most recent first and using the dates when the survey fieldwork was done, as opposed to the date of publication. Where the fieldwork dates are unknown, the date of publication is given instead. The highest percentage figure in each polling survey is displayed with its background shaded in the leading party's colour. If a tie ensues, this is applied to the figures with the highest percentages. The "Lead" column on the right shows the percentage-point difference between the parties with the highest percentages in a poll.

=== Voting intention estimates ===
The table below lists weighted voting intention estimates. Refusals are generally excluded from the party vote percentages, while question wording and the treatment of "don't know" responses and those not intending to vote may vary between polling organisations. When available, seat projections determined by the polling organisations are displayed below (or in place of) the percentages in a smaller font; 21 seats were required for an absolute majority in the City Council of Barcelona (22 in the 1991 election).

Color key:

Exit poll

Polling firm/Commissioner	Fieldwork date	Sample size	Turnout	PSC	CiU	PP	IC	ERC	Lead
1995 municipal election	28 May 1995	—N/a	66.2	38.4; 16	30.6; 13	16.6; 7	7.6; 3	5.1; 2	7.8
Eco Consulting/TV3	28 May 1995	?	?	37.4; 16/17	29.7; 12/13	16.2; 6/7	8.2; 3	5.7; 2	7.7
Vox Pública/Antena 3	28 May 1995	?	?	? 16/17	? 12/13	? 6/7	? 3	? 2	?
Demoscopia/Tele 5	28 May 1995	?	?	? 16/17	? 12/13	? 7/8	? 3/4	? 2	?
Sigma Dos/COPE	28 May 1995	?	?	? 16	? 12/13	? 7/8	? 3	? 2	?
Marketing Telefónico/Avui	21 May 1995	906	?	34.3; 16	36.1; 17	13.7; 5	7.8; 3	4.2; 0	1.8
Vox Pública/El Periódico	18–19 May 1995	800	?	34.2; 15/16	32.0; 14/15	15.2; 7	10.2; 4	4.4; 0	2.2
Opina/La Vanguardia	17 May 1995	1,500	?	37.9; 16/17	35.3; 15/16	11.1; 5	8.8; 3/4	4.0; 0	2.6
Demoscopia/El País	10–15 May 1995	1,000	?	31.3; 14/15	32.6; 14/15	15.8; 6/7	10.5; 4	4.8; 0/2	1.3
CIS	26 Apr–11 May 1995	700	65.7	34.2	34.6	14.7	8.4	5.8	0.4
Sigma Dos/El Mundo	3–7 May 1995	500	?	32.0; 14/15	32.0; 14/15	17.8; 7/8	7.7; 3	6.2; 2	Tie
Opina/La Vanguardia	18 Apr 1995	1,000	?	38.0; 15/16	40.0; 16/17	8.5; 4/5	7.0; 3/4	5.0; 0/2	2.0
Vox Pública/El Periódico	29–30 Mar 1995	800	?	31.9; 14/15	37.6; 17	13.1; 5/6	8.8; 4	4.5; 0	5.7
Atelier-V/PP (Note: Undecided and/or abstentionists excluded.)	20 Feb 1995	800	?	32.0; 15	33.0; 15	21.0; 8	8.0; 2	6.0; 1	1.0
Gruppo/ABC	9–14 Feb 1995	400	?	32.7; 15/16	34.8; 16/17	16.2; 7/8	7.7; 3	5.2; 0/2	2.1
Opina/La Vanguardia	12–13 Dec 1994	1,000	?	38.1; 16/17	39.3; 17	9.8; 4	7.8; 3	5.0; 0/1	1.2
Marketing Telefónico/Avui	6 Nov 1994	?	?	34.8; 16/17	35.8; 16/18	? 6/7	? 3	? 0/2	1.0
1994 EP election	12 Jun 1994	—N/a	54.3	23.1 (10)	31.7 (14)	23.4 (10)	11.3 (5)	5.3 (2)	8.3
1993 general election	6 Jun 1993	—N/a	77.2	28.9 (13)	32.5 (15)	21.8 (10)	8.1 (3)	4.8 (0)	3.6
1992 regional election	15 Mar 1992	—N/a	55.5	23.5 (10)	47.5 (22)	8.6 (3)	7.0 (3)	7.5 (3)	24.0
1991 municipal election	26 May 1991	—N/a	55.5	42.9; 20	34.1; 16	9.8; 4	6.4; 3	2.6; 0	8.8

=== Voting preferences ===
The table below lists raw, unweighted voting preferences.

Polling firm/Commissioner	Fieldwork date	Sample size	PSC	CiU	PP	IC	ERC	Question	X mark	Lead
1995 municipal election	28 May 1995	—N/a	25.4	20.2	11.0	5.0	3.4	—N/a	33.8	5.2
CIS	26 Apr–11 May 1995	700	31.9	22.1	4.6	4.4	3.9	22.1	7.9	9.8
1994 EP election (Note: Does not include non-resident citizens.)	12 Jun 1994	—N/a	12.5	17.1	12.7	6.1	2.9	—N/a	45.7	4.4
1993 general election	6 Jun 1993	—N/a	22.3	25.0	16.7	6.3	3.7	—N/a	22.8	2.7
1992 regional election	15 Mar 1992	—N/a	13.0	26.3	4.8	4.2	3.9	—N/a	44.5	13.3
1991 municipal election	26 May 1991	—N/a	23.8	18.9	5.4	3.6	1.4	—N/a	44.5	4.9

=== Victory preferences ===
The table below lists opinion polling on the victory preferences for each party in the event of a municipal election taking place.

Polling firm/Commissioner	Fieldwork date	Sample size	PSC	CiU	Other/ None	Question	Lead
CIS	26 Apr–11 May 1995	700	43.5	30.9	–	25.5	12.6

=== Victory likelihood ===
The table below lists opinion polling on the perceived likelihood of victory for each party in the event of a municipal election taking place.

Polling firm/Commissioner	Fieldwork date	Sample size	PSC	CiU	Other/ None	Question	Lead
CIS	26 Apr–11 May 1995	700	47.0	27.8	–	25.1	19.2

=== Preferred Mayor ===
The table below lists opinion polling on leader preferences to become mayor of Barcelona.

Polling firm/Commissioner	Fieldwork date	Sample size			Other/ None/ Not care	Question	Lead
Polling firm/Commissioner	Fieldwork date	Sample size	Maragall PSC	Roca CiU	Other/ None/ Not care	Question	Lead
CIS	26 Apr–11 May 1995	700	52.4	28.1	4.7	14.8	24.3
CIS	20 Feb–6 Mar 1995	?	53.3	27.5	2.5	16.7	25.8

== Results ==
← Summary of the 28 May 1995 City Council of Barcelona election results →
Parties and alliances	Popular vote			Seats	
Parties and alliances	Votes	%	±pp	Total	+/−
Socialists' Party of Catalonia (PSC–PSOE)	347,083	38.39	−4.56	16	−4
Convergence and Union (CiU)	276,276	30.56	−3.50	13	−3
People's Party (PP)	150,284	16.62	+6.83	7	+3
Initiative for Catalonia–The Greens (IC–EV)^{1}	68,813	7.61	+0.03	3	±0
Republican Left of Catalonia (ERC)	46,272	5.12	+2.55	2	+2
Ecologist Alternative of Catalonia (AEC)	3,304	0.37	New	0	±0
Democratic and Social Centre (CDS)	1,256	0.14	−0.70	0	±0
Revolutionary Workers' Party (POR)	726	0.08	+0.01	0	±0
Civic Platform–New Socialist Party (PC–NPS)	571	0.06	New	0	±0
Workers' Revolutionary Party (PRT)^{2}	376	0.04	−0.13	0	±0
Platform of Independents of Spain (PIE)	320	0.04	New	0	±0
Humanist Platform (PH)^{3}	298	0.03	−0.77	0	±0
European Nation State (N)	181	0.02	New	0	±0
Blank ballots	8,263	0.91	−0.01		
Total	904,023			41	−2
Valid votes	904,023	99.78	+0.08		
Invalid votes	2,015	0.22	−0.08		
Votes cast / turnout	906,038	66.22	+10.71		
Abstentions	462,110	33.78	−10.71		
Registered voters	1,368,148				
Sources
Footnotes: ^{1} Initiative for Catalonia–The Greens results are compared to the combined totals of Initiative for Catalonia, Green Barcelona and Party of the Communists of Catalonia in the 1991 election.; ^{2} Workers' Revolutionary Party results are compared to Workers' Socialist Party totals in the 1991 election.; ^{3} Humanist Platform results are compared to The Greens Ecologist–Humanist List totals in the 1991 election.

Popular vote
PSC–PSOE	38.39%
CiU	30.56%
PP	16.62%
IC–EV	7.61%
ERC	5.12%
Others	0.78%
Blank ballots	0.91%

Seats
PSC–PSOE	39.00%
CiU	31.71%
PP	17.07%
IC–EV	7.32%
ERC	4.88%

== Aftermath ==
=== Government formation ===
Investiture
Ballot →	17 June 1995	
Required majority →	21 out of 41	
Pasqual Maragall (PSC): • PSC (16)	16 / 41	check
Enrique Lacalle (PP): • PP (7)	7 / 41	X mark
Pilar Rahola (ERC): • ERC (2)	2 / 41	X mark
Abstentions/Blank ballots: • CiU (13); • IC–EV (3)	16 / 41	
Absentees	0 / 41	

=== 1997 investiture ===
Investiture
Ballot →	26 September 1997	
Required majority →	21 out of 41	
Joan Clos (PSC): • PSC (16); • IC–EV (3); • PI (2)	21 / 41	check
Miquel Roca (CiU): • CiU (13)	13 / 41	X mark
Enrique Lacalle (PP): • PP (7)	7 / 41	X mark
Abstentions/Blank ballots	0 / 41	
Absentees	0 / 41	

== Bibliography ==
- Decreto 1166/1960, de 23 de mayo, por el que se establece un régimen especial para el Municipio de Barcelona, conforme a lo autorizado por el artículo 94 de la vigente Ley de Régimen Local (PDF) (Decree 1166/1960). Official State Gazette (in Spanish). 23 May 1960. BOE-A-1960-9155.
- Constitución Española (Constitution). Official State Gazette (in Spanish). 27 December 1978 [version as of 28 August 1992]. BOE-A-1978-31229.
- Ley 7/1985, de 2 de abril, Reguladora de las Bases del Régimen Local (Law 7/1985). Official State Gazette (in Spanish). 2 April 1985 [version as of 31 December 1994]. BOE-A-1985-5392.
- Ley Orgánica 5/1985, de 19 de junio, del Régimen Electoral General (Organic Law 5/1985). Official State Gazette (in Spanish). 19 June 1985 [version as of 24 March 1995]. BOE-A-1985-11672.
- Real Decreto 489/1995, de 3 de abril, de convocatoria de elecciones locales y a las Asambleas de Ceuta y Melilla (Royal Decree 489/1995). Official State Gazette (in Spanish). 3 April 1995. BOE-A-1995-8132.
