= Synagogue of Barcelona =

Synagogue in Barcelona, Spain

- Spanish: Sinagoga de la Comunidad Israelita de Barcelona
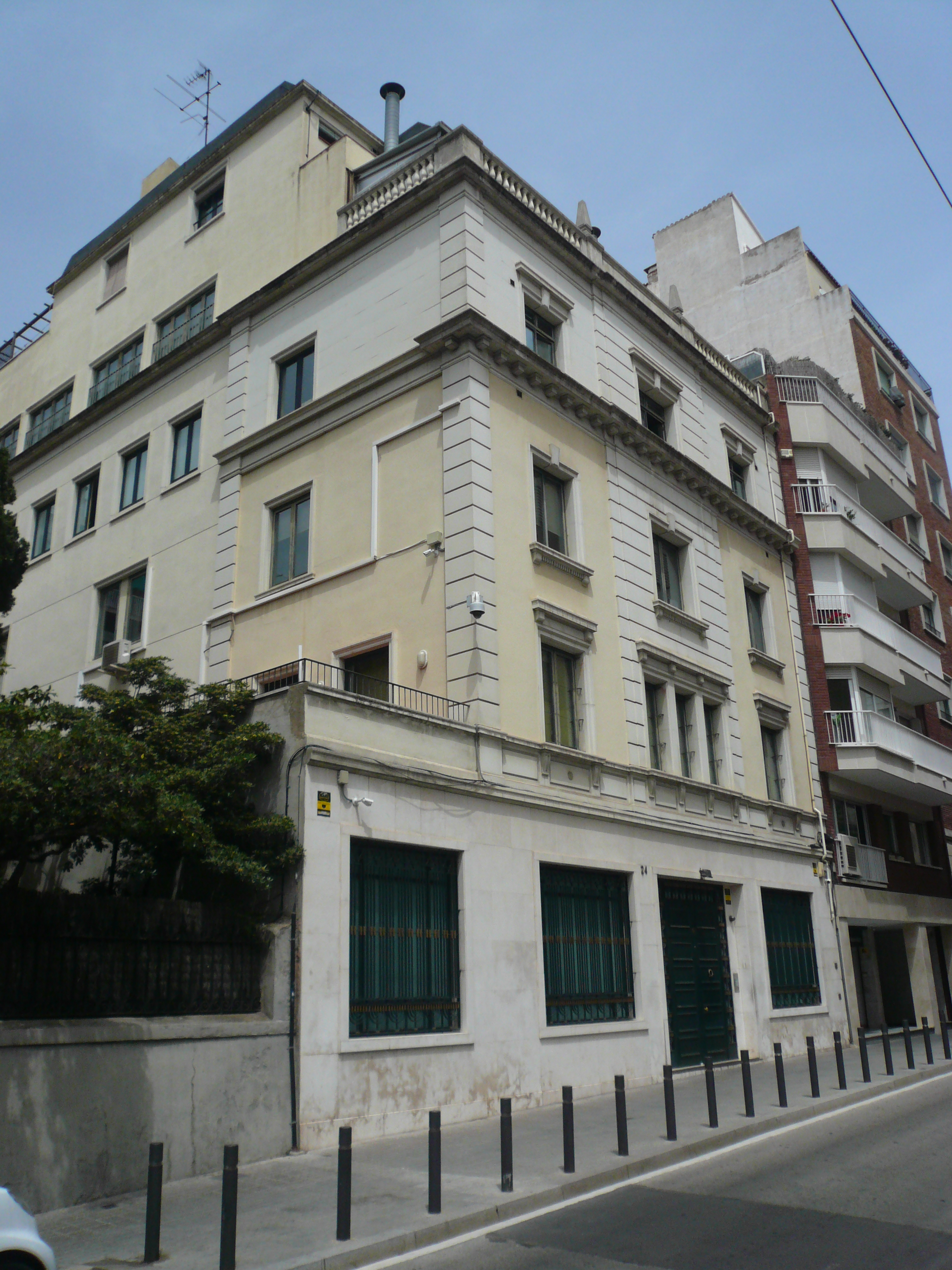
- Exterior of the synagogue in 2015

- Location of the synagogue in Barcelona

Religion
- Affiliation: Judaism
- Rite: Nusach Ashkenaz; Nusach Sephardi
- Ecclesiastical or organizational status: Synagogue
- Status: Active

Location
- Location: 24 Carrer de l'Avenir, Barcelona, Catalonia
- Country: Spain
- Interactive map of Synagogue of Barcelona
- Coordinates: 41°23′48″N 2°8′53″E

Architecture
- Type: Synagogue architecture
- Completed: 1954
- Materials: Brick

The Synagogue of Barcelona, officially, the Synagogue of the Jewish Community of Barcelona (Spanish: Sinagoga de la Comunidad Israelita de Barcelona), is a Jewish congregation, synagogue, and cultural center, located at 24 Carrer de l'Avenir, in the city of Barcelona, in Catalonia, Spain. Completed in 1954, the three-story building provides a place of worship with two synagogues, one Sephardic and the other Ashkenazi, and also has a library and a conference room.

== History ==
On 18 January 2015 the temple held an homage to the victims of the Charlie Hebdo attacks in Paris. Members of different religions participated in the event, including Pilar Rahola, a Catalan journalist.

== See also ==
- History of the Jews in Catalonia
- List of synagogues in Spain
