= Josep Marià de Cabanes i d'Escofet =

Spanish politician (1775–1842)

Josep Marià de Cabanes i d'Escofet (1775 – 4 April 1842) was a Spanish politician, and a member of the Progressive Party. He served as the first mayor of Barcelona.

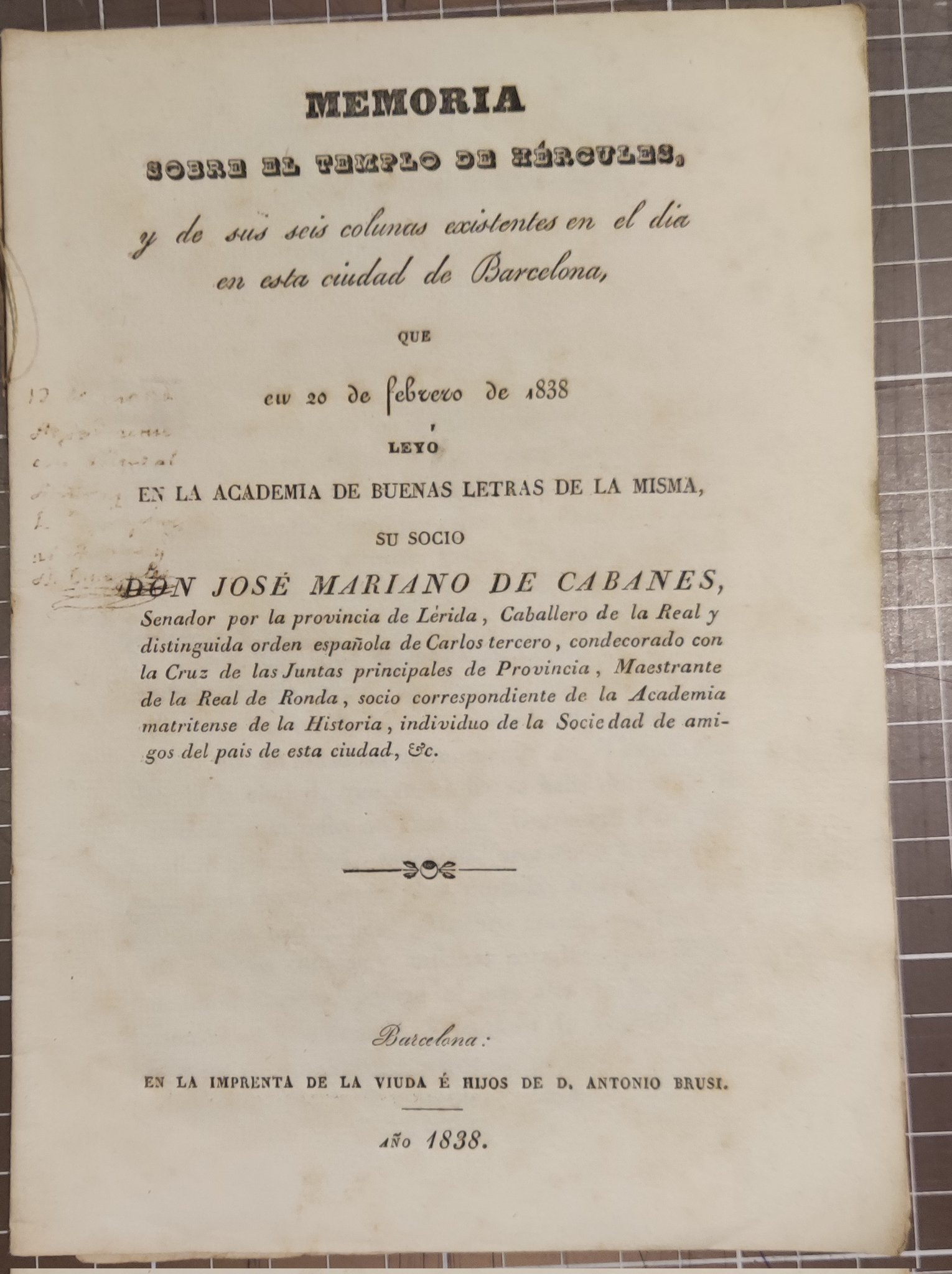
Memory on the Temple of Hercules, and its six columns existing in the day in this city of Barcelona (Published by Josep Marià de Cabanes i d'Escofet in 1838)

== Life and work ==
During the Liberal Triennium), in 1821–1822, he played a prominent role in the Board of Health during the yellow fever epidemic of 1821. He was also a senator for Lleida.

From 1816, he was a member of the Royal Academy of Letters of Barcelona and a correspondent of the Academy of History in Madrid, he compiled one of the most complete numismatic collections in Spain.

He is buried in the Poblenou Cemetery.
