= 1987 Barcelona municipal election =

Election in the Spanish municipality of Barcelona

- 10 June 1987

All 43 seats in the City Council of Barcelona 22 seats needed for a majority
- Opinion polls
- Registered: 1,342,049 ▼1.3%
- Turnout: 925,036 (68.9%) ▲1.5 pp
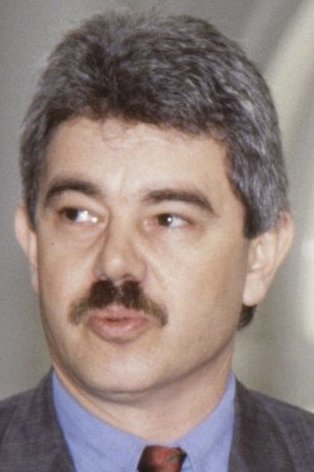

	First party	Second party	Third party
Leader	Pasqual Maragall	Josep Maria Cullell	Enrique Lacalle
Party	PSC–PSOE	CiU	AP
Leader since	2 December 1982	1987	1987
Last election	21 seats, 45.8%	13 seats, 27.4%	5 seats (CP) (Note: Within the AP–PDP–UL alliance in the 1983 election: AP (5 seats) and PDP (1 seat).)
Seats won	21	17	3
Seat change	0	▲4	▼2
Popular vote	400,280	325,463	69,419
Percentage	43.6%	35.5%	7.6%
Swing	▼2.2 pp	▲8.1 pp	n/a
	Fourth party	Fifth party
Leader	Eulàlia Vintró	Francisco Salvador Avila
Party	IC	PDP
Leader since	1987	1987
Last election	3 seats, 8.0% (Note: Results for PSUC (6.9%, 3 seats) and PCC (1.1%, 0 seats) in the 1983 election.)	1 seat (CP)
Seats won	2	0
Seat change	▼1	▼1
Popular vote	47,406	0
Percentage	5.2%	0.0%
Swing	▼2.8 pp	n/a
Mayor before election
Pasqual Maragall
PSC
Mayor after election
Pasqual Maragall
PSC

A municipal election was held in Barcelona on 10 June 1987 to elect the 3rd City Council of the municipality. All 43 seats in the City Council were up for election. It was held concurrently with regional elections in thirteen autonomous communities and local elections all across Spain, as well as the 1987 European Parliament election.

== Overview ==
Under the 1978 Constitution, the governance of municipalities in Spain—part of the country's local government system—was centered on the figure of city councils (Spanish: ayuntamientos), local corporations with independent legal personality composed of a mayor, a government council and an elected legislative assembly. The mayor was indirectly elected by the local assembly, requiring an absolute majority; otherwise, the candidate from the most-voted party automatically became mayor (ties were resolved by drawing lots). In the case of Barcelona, the top-tier administrative and governing body was the City Council of Barcelona.

=== Date ===
The term of local assemblies in Spain expired four years after the date of their previous election. The election decree was required to be issued no later than 25 days prior to the scheduled expiration date of the assemblies and published on the following day in the Official State Gazette (BOE), with election day taking place between 54 and 60 days after the decree's publication. The previous local elections were held on 8 May 1983, which meant that the chambers' terms would have expired on 8 May 1987. The election decree was required to be published in the BOE no later than 14 April 1987, setting the latest possible date for election day on 13 June 1987.

Local assemblies could not be dissolved before the expiration of their term, except in cases of mismanagement that seriously harmed the public interest and implied a breach of constitutional obligations, in which case the Council of Ministers could—optionally—decide to call a by-election.

Elections to the assemblies of local entities were officially called on 14 April 1987 with the publication of the corresponding decree in the BOE, setting election day for 10 June.

=== Electoral system ===
Voting for local assemblies was based on universal suffrage, comprising all Spanish nationals over 18 years of age, registered and residing in the municipality and with full political rights (provided that they had not been deprived of the right to vote by a final sentence, nor were legally incapacitated), as well as resident non-nationals whose country of origin allowed reciprocal voting by virtue of a treaty.

Local councillors were elected using the D'Hondt method and closed-list proportional voting, with a five percent-threshold of valid votes (including blank ballots) in each municipality. Each municipality was a multi-member constituency, with a number of seats based on the following scale:

Population	Councillors
<250	5
251–1,000	7
1,001–2,000	9
2,001–5,000	11
5,001–10,000	13
10,001–20,000	17
20,001–50,000	21
50,001–100,000	25
>100,001	+1 per each 100,000 inhabitants or fraction +1 if total is an even number

The law did not provide for by-elections to fill vacant seats; instead, any vacancies arising after the proclamation of candidates and during the legislative term were filled by the next candidates on the party lists or, when required, by designated substitutes.

== Parties and candidates ==
The electoral law allowed for parties and federations registered in the interior ministry, alliances and groupings of electors to present lists of candidates. Parties and federations intending to form an alliance were required to inform the relevant electoral commission within 10 days of the election call, whereas groupings of electors needed to secure the signature of a determined amount of the electors registered in the municipality for which they sought election, disallowing electors from signing for more than one list. In the case of Barcelona, as its population was over 1,000,001, at least 8,000 signatures were required.

Below is a list of the main parties and alliances which contested the election:

Candidacy	Parties and alliances	Leading candidate	Ideology	Previous result		Gov.	Ref.
Candidacy	Parties and alliances	Leading candidate	Ideology	Vote %	Seats	Gov.	Ref.
PSC–PSOE	List: Socialists' Party of Catalonia (PSC–PSOE)	Pasqual Maragall	Social democracy	45.8%	21	Yes	
CiU	List: Democratic Convergence of Catalonia (CDC); Democratic Union of Catalonia (UDC)	Josep Maria Cullell	Catalan nationalism Centrism	27.4%	13	No	
AP	List: People's Alliance (AP)	Enrique Lacalle	Conservatism; National conservatism	13.0%	6	No	
PDP	List: People's Democratic Party (PDP)	Francisco Salvador Avila	Christian democracy	13.0%	6	No	
IC	List: Initiative for Catalonia (IC) – Unified Socialist Party of Catalonia (PSUC) – Party of the Communists of Catalonia (PCC)	Eulàlia Vintró	Eco-socialism; Green politics	8.0%	3	Yes	
ERC	List: Republican Left of Catalonia (ERC)	Albert Alay	Catalan nationalism Left-wing nationalism Social democracy	3.9%	0	No	
CDS	List: Democratic and Social Centre (CDS)	Antoni Fernández Teixidó	Centrism; Liberalism	0.9%	0	No	

== Opinion polls ==
The tables below list opinion polling results in reverse chronological order, showing the most recent first and using the dates when the survey fieldwork was done, as opposed to the date of publication. Where the fieldwork dates are unknown, the date of publication is given instead. The highest percentage figure in each polling survey is displayed with its background shaded in the leading party's colour. If a tie ensues, this is applied to the figures with the highest percentages. The "Lead" column on the right shows the percentage-point difference between the parties with the highest percentages in a poll.

=== Voting intention estimates ===
The table below lists weighted voting intention estimates. Refusals are generally excluded from the party vote percentages, while question wording and the treatment of "don't know" responses and those not intending to vote may vary between polling organisations. When available, seat projections determined by the polling organisations are displayed below (or in place of) the percentages in a smaller font; 22 seats were required for an absolute majority in the City Council of Barcelona.

Polling firm/Commissioner	Fieldwork date	Sample size	Turnout	PSC	CiU	AP–PDP–PL	PSUC	ERC	CDS	AP	IC	Lead
1987 municipal election	10 Jun 1987	—N/a	68.9	43.6; 21	35.5; 17	–	(Note: Within IC.)	2.3; 0	3.4; 0	7.6; 3	5.2; 2	8.1
Sigma Dos/Diario 16	4 Jun 1987	?	?	? 19/21	? 14/16	–		–	–	? 5/6	? 2/3	?
DYM/Cambio 16	4 Jun 1987	?	?	? 21/23	? 13/14	–		–	? 1/2	? 2/4	? 2/3	?
ABC	2 Jun 1987	?	?	? 20/22	? 17/19	–		–	–	? 3/5	–	?
Central de Campo/PSC	1–2 Jun 1987	800	?	? 23/24	? 14/15	–		–	–	? 3/4	? 2	?
Demoscopia/El País	22–26 May 1987	?	68	32.9; 15	33.6; 16	–		2.8; 0	5.9; 2	15.5; 7	7.7; 3	0.7
DYM/La Vanguardia	27–29 Apr 1987	1,001	?	46.8; 23	29.1; 14	–		4.2; 0	2.7; 0	7.6; 3	6.8; 3	17.7
Line Staff/CiU (Note: Undecided and/or abstentionists excluded.)	4–10 Apr 1987	1,478	?	39.1	30.0	–		2.7	1.2	2.3	2.8	9.1
CIS	25 Mar–5 Apr 1987	802	?	48.6; 25	29.5; 15	–		–	–	5.8; 3	–	19.1
1986 general election	22 Jun 1986	—N/a	67.4	34.4 (18)	34.1 (18)	14.7 (7)	(Note: Within UEC.)	3.1 (0)	4.9 (0)	(Note: Within AP–PDP–UL/AP–PDP–PL.)	4.2 (Note: Results for UEC in the 1986 general election.) (0)	0.3
1984 regional election	29 Apr 1984	—N/a	64.4	26.4 (13)	49.0 (25)	10.3 (5)	5.0 (0)	4.7 (0)	–		–	22.6
1983 municipal election	8 May 1983	—N/a	67.4	45.8; 21	27.4; 13	13.0; 6	6.9; 3	3.9; 0	0.9; 0		–	18.4

== Results ==
← Summary of the 10 June 1987 City Council of Barcelona election results →
Parties and alliances	Popular vote			Seats	
Parties and alliances	Votes	%	±pp	Total	+/−
Socialists' Party of Catalonia (PSC–PSOE)	400,280	43.61	−2.19	21	±0
Convergence and Union (CiU)	325,463	35.46	+8.09	17	+4
People's Alliance (AP)^{1}	69,419	7.56	n/a	3	−2
Initiative for Catalonia (IC)^{2}	47,406	5.16	−2.83	2	−1
Democratic and Social Centre (CDS)	31,028	3.38	+2.44	0	±0
Republican Left of Catalonia (ERC)	21,236	2.31	−1.55	0	±0
Green Alternative–Ecologist Movement of Catalonia (AV–MEC)	3,916	0.43	New	0	±0
Ecologist Party of Catalonia–VERDE (PEC–VERDE)	3,116	0.34	New	0	±0
Workers' Party of Spain–Communist Unity (PTE–UC)	2,078	0.23	New	0	±0
Spanish Phalanx of the CNSO (FE–JONS)	1,388	0.15	+0.02	0	±0
Revolutionary Workers' Party of Spain (PORE)	1,152	0.13	+0.03	0	±0
Republican Popular Unity (UPR)^{3}	1,069	0.12	+0.03	0	±0
Humanist Platform (PH)	948	0.10	New	0	±0
Communist Unification of Spain (UCE)	869	0.09	New	0	±0
Internationalist Socialist Workers' Party (POSI)	636	0.07	New	0	±0
Social Democratic Party of Catalonia (PSDC)	566	0.06	New	0	±0
Communist Workers' League (LOC)	428	0.05	New	0	±0
People's Democratic Party (PDP)^{1}	0	0.00	n/a	0	±0
Blank ballots	6,879	0.75	+0.32		
Total	917,877			43	±0
Valid votes	917,877	99.23	+0.87		
Invalid votes	7,159	0.77	−0.87		
Votes cast / turnout	925,036	68.93	+1.51		
Abstentions	417,013	31.07	−1.51		
Registered voters	1,342,049				
Sources
Footnotes: ^{1} Within the People's Coalition alliance in the 1983 election.; ^{2} Initiative for Catalonia results are compared to the combined totals of Unified Socialist Party of Catalonia and Party of the Communists of Catalonia in the 1983 election.; ^{3} Republican Popular Unity results are compared to Popular Struggle Coalition totals in the 1983 election.

Popular vote
PSC–PSOE	43.61%
CiU	35.46%
AP	7.56%
IC	5.16%
CDS	3.38%
ERC	2.31%
Others	1.76%
Blank ballots	0.75%

Seats
PSC–PSOE	48.84%
CiU	39.53%
AP	6.98%
IC	4.65%

== Aftermath ==
=== Government formation ===
Investiture
Ballot →	30 June 1987	
Required majority →	22 out of 43	
Pasqual Maragall (PSC): • PSC (20)	20 / 43	check
Josep Maria Cullell (CiU): • CiU (17); • AP (3)	20 / 43	X mark
Abstentions/Blank ballots: • IC (2)	2 / 43	
Absentees: • PSC (1)	1 / 43	

== Bibliography ==
- Decreto 1166/1960, de 23 de mayo, por el que se establece un régimen especial para el Municipio de Barcelona, conforme a lo autorizado por el artículo 94 de la vigente Ley de Régimen Local (PDF) (Decree 1166/1960). Official State Gazette (in Spanish). 23 May 1960. BOE-A-1960-9155.
- Constitución Española (Constitution). Official State Gazette (in Spanish). 27 December 1978 [version as of 29 December 1978]. BOE-A-1978-31229.
- Ley 7/1985, de 2 de abril, Reguladora de las Bases del Régimen Local (Law 7/1985). Official State Gazette (in Spanish). 2 April 1985 [version as of 3 April 1985]. BOE-A-1985-5392.
- Ley Orgánica 5/1985, de 19 de junio, del Régimen Electoral General (Organic Law 5/1985). Official State Gazette (in Spanish). 19 June 1985 [version as of 3 April 1987]. BOE-A-1985-11672.
- Real Decreto 508/1987, de 13 de abril, de convocatoria de elecciones locales (Royal Decree 508/1987). Official State Gazette (in Spanish). 13 April 1987. BOE-A-1987-9222.
