= List of mayors of Barcelona =

Mayor of Barcelona
- Alcalde de Barcelona
- Coat of arms of Barcelona

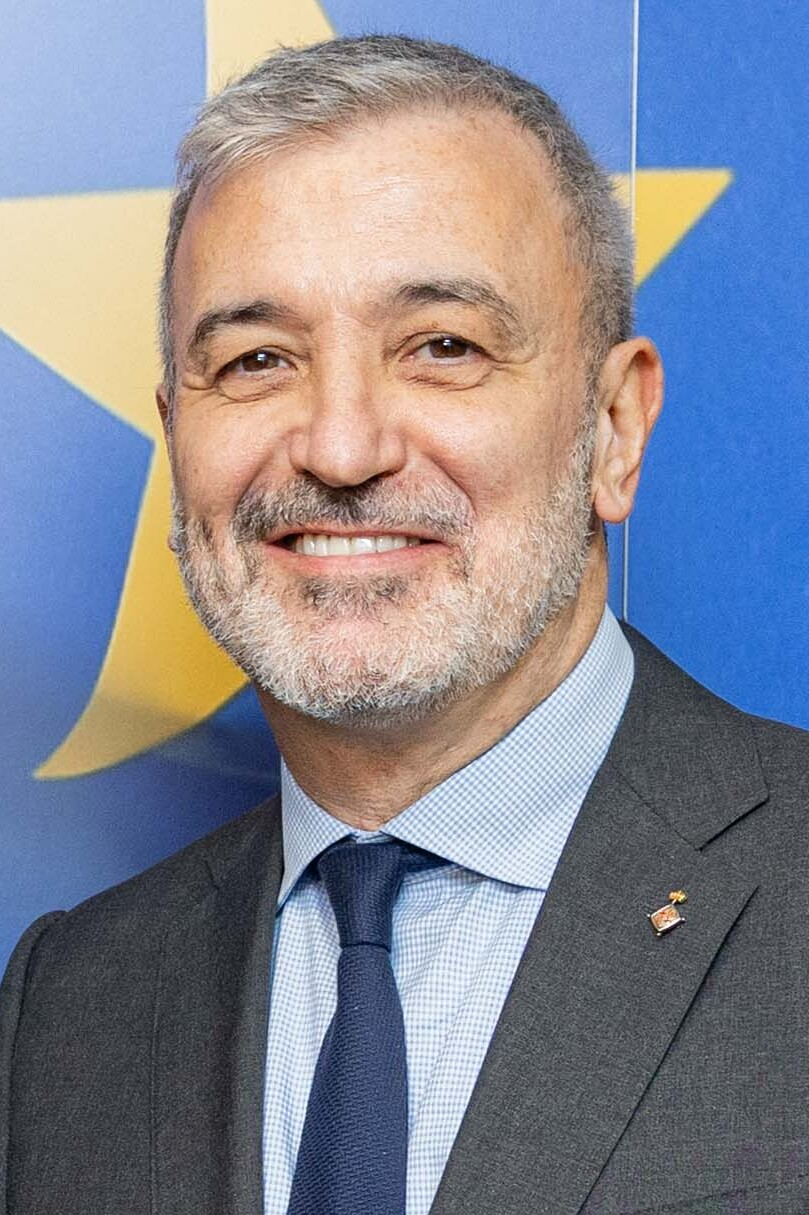
- Incumbent; Jaume Collboni since 17 June 2023
- Seat: Barcelona City Hall
- Appointer: City Council of Barcelona
- Term length: 4 years, renewable
- Constituting instrument: Organic Law 5/1985
- Inaugural holder: Josep Marià de Cabanes i d'Escofet
- Formation: 1835
- Website: https://ajuntament.barcelona.cat/alcaldessa/es

This is a list of mayors of Barcelona since 1835. The Mayor of Barcelona is the highest political authority of the Barcelona City Council. In accordance with Organic Law 5/1985, of June 19, on the General Electoral Regime (currently in force), the mayor or mayoress is elected by the municipal corporation of councilors, who in turn are elected by universal suffrage by the citizens of Barcelona with the right to vote, through municipal elections held every four years. The candidate who obtains the absolute majority of the votes is proclaimed elected. If none of them obtains said majority, the councilor who heads the most voted list is proclaimed mayor.

== History ==
Barcelona City Council has had a total of 118 mayors since it was founded in 1835. The first mayor of the city was José Mariano de Cabanes, who held office for six months, between November 1835 and April 1836. Among the mayors who have especially gone down in history, can be noted Francisco de Paula Rius i Taulet (promoting and holding the mayoralty at the Universal Exposition of 1888, during the Bourbon Restoration), Carles Pi i Sunyer (first mayor elected by universal suffrage, during the Second Republic), José María de Porcioles (mayor who held office the longest, during the Franco dictatorship), Narcís Serra (first mayor elected in the current democratic system), Pasqual Maragall (mayor who held office the longest in democracy as well as for promoting and holding the mayoralty in the 1992 Olympic Games) or Ada Colau (the first female mayor in the history of the city).

== List of mayors ==
#	Name	Portrait	Term in office		Party affiliation
1	Josep Marià de Cabanes i d'Escofet		1835	1836	Progressive Party
2	Marià Vehils		1836	1836	Moderate Party
3	Marià Borrell		1836	1837	Progressive Party
4	Guillem Oliver i Salvà		1837	1839	Progressive Party
5	Francesc Coll i Jové		1839	1839	Moderate Party
6	Jacint Feliu Domènech i Sastre		1839	1840	Progressive Party
7	Josep Maluquer i Montardit		1840	1841	Progressive Party
8	Ramon Ferrer i Garcés		1841	1841	Progressive Party
9	Tomàs Maria de Quintana i Badia		1841	1842	Progressive Party
10	Josep Maria de Freixes i de Borràs		1842	1843	Progressive Party
11	Josep Maluquer i Montardit		1843	1843	Progressive Party
12	Josep Bertran i Ros		1843	1844	Moderate Party
13	Josep Parladé i Llucià		1844	1846	Moderate Party
14	Erasme de Janer i de Gònima		1846	1846	Moderate Party
15	Tomàs Metzger i Milans		1846	1847	Moderate Party
16	Pere Bardají i Balanzat		1847	1848	Moderate Party
17	Domingo Portefaix y Páez		1848	1849	Moderate Party
18	Sebastià Garcia i Pego		1849	1849	Moderate Party
19	Joan Pérez i Calvo		1849	1851	Moderate Party
20	Ramon de Paternó		1851	1851	Moderate Party
21	Santiago Lluís Dupuy de Lôme		1851	1852	Moderate Party
22	Josep Bertran i Ros		1852	1854	Moderate Party
23	Antoni Aherán		1854	1854	Moderate Party
24	Ramon Ferrer i Garcés		1854	1854	Progressive Party
25	Antoni Viadera i Surreu		1854	1855	Progressive Party
26	Josep Molins i Negre		1855	1856	Progressive Party
27	Francesc Permanyer i Tuyets		1856	1856	Unión Liberal
28	Ramon Figueras		1856	1858	Moderate Party
29	Josep Santa-Maria i Gelbert		1858	1863	Unión Liberal
30	Joan Baptista Madremany		1863	1863	Moderate Party
31	Valentí Cabello		1863	1865	Moderate Party
32	Antoni de Quevedo i Donis		1865	1866	Moderate Party
33	Ramon de Mazón		1866	1866	Unión Liberal
34	Emili M. de Ortega		1866	1866	Moderate Party
35	Lluís Rodríguez i Tréllez		1866	1867	Moderate Party
36	Joan López de Bustamante		1867	1868	Moderate Party
37	Salvador Maluquer i Aytés		1868	1869	Progressive Party
38	Francesc Sunyer i Capdevila		1869	1869	Partit Republicà Democràtic Federal
39	Santiago Soler i Pla		1869	1869	Partit Republicà Democràtic Federal
40	Francesc Soler i Matas		1869	1872	Progressive Party
41	Francesc Rius i Taulet		1872	1873	Constitutional Party
42	Narcís Buxó i Prats		1873	1873	Partit Republicà Democràtic Federal
43	Miquel González i Sugranyes		1873	1874	Partit Republicà Democràtic Federal
44	Francesc Rius i Taulet		1874	1874	Constitutional Party
45	Ot Ferrer i Nin		1874	1875	Constitutional Party
46	Ramon Maria de Sentmenat i Despujol		1875	1876	Conservative Party
47	Manuel Girona i Agrafel		1876	1877	Conservative Party
48	Albert Faura i Aranyó		1877	1879	Conservative Party
49	Enric de Duran i de Duran		1879	1881	Conservative Party
50	Francesc Rius i Taulet		1881	1884	Liberal Party
51	Albert Faura i Aranyó		1884	1884	Conservative Party
52	Joan Coll i Pujol		1884	1885	Conservative Party
53	Francesc Rius i Taulet		1885	1890	Liberal Party
54	Fèlix Maciá i Bonaplata		1890	1890	Liberal Party
55	Joan Coll i Pujol		1890	1891	Conservative Party
56	Manuel Porcar i Tió		1891	1892	Liberal Party
57	Domènec Martí i Gofau		1892	1893	Conservative Party
58	Camil Fabra i Fontanills		1893	1893	Liberal Party
59	Manuel Henrich i Girona		1893	1894	Liberal Party
60	Josep Collaso i Gil		1894	1895	Liberal Party
61	Josep Maria Rius i Badia		1895	1896	Conservative Party
62	Josep Maria de Nadal i Vilardaga		1896	1897	Conservative Party
63	Joan Coll i Pujol		1897	1897	Conservative Party
64	Josep Collaso i Gil		1897	1898	Liberal Party
65	Josep Griera i Dulcet		1898	1899	Conservative Party
66	Bartomeu Robert i Yarzábal		1899	1899	Conservative Party
67	Josep Milà i Pi		1899	1900	Liberal Party
68	Joan Coll i Pujol		1900	1901	Conservative Party
69	Joan Amat i Sormaní		1901	1902	Liberal Party
70	Josep Monegal i Nogués		1902	1903	Conservative Party
71	Guillem de Boladeres i Romà		1903	1904	Conservative Party
72	Gabriel Lluch i Anfruns		1904	1905	Liberal Party
73	Ròmul Bosch i Alsina		1905	1905	Liberal Party
74	Salvador de Samà i Torrents		1905	1906	Liberal Party
75	Domènec Sanllehy i Alrich		1906	1908	Conservative Party
76	Albert Bastardas i Sampere		1908	1909	Partit Republicà Autonomista
77	Joan Coll i Pujol		1909	1909	Conservative Party
78	Josep Collaso i Gil		1909	1910	Liberal Party
79	Josep Roig i Bergadà		1910	1910	Liberal Party
80	Salvador de Samà i Torrents		1910	1911	Liberal Party
81	Joaquim Sostres i Rey		1911	1913	Liberal Party
82	Josep Collaso i Gil		1913	1913	Liberal Party
83	Joaquim Sagnier i Villavecchia		1913	1914	Conservative Party
84	Guillem de Boladeres i Romà		1914	1915	Conservative Party
85	Antoni Martínez i Domingo		1915	1916	Conservative Party
86	Manuel Rius i Rius		1916	1917	Centre Nacionalista Republicà
87	Antonio Martínez Domingo (2)		1917	1917	Partido Conservador
88	Lluís Duran i Ventosa		1917	1917	Lliga Regionalista
89	Juan José Rocha García		1917	1918	PRR
90	Manuel Morales Pareja		1918	1919	PRR
91	Antonio Martínez Domingo (3)		1919	1922	Lliga Regionalista
92	Fernando Fabra i Puig		1922	1923	Partido Liberal
93	Josep Banqué i Feliu		1923	1923	Dictatorship of Primo de Rivera
94	Fernando Álvarez de la Campa		1923	1924	Dictatorship of Primo de Rivera
95	Darío Rumeu i Freixa		1924	1930	Dictatorship of Primo de Rivera
96	Juan Antonio Güell i López		1930	1931	Lliga Regionalista
97	Jaume Aiguader		1931	1934	ERC
98	Carles Pi i Sunyer (1)		1934	1934	ERC
99	José Martínez Herrera		1934	1935	Military
100	Juan Pich y Pon		1935	1935	PRR
101	Francisco Jaumar de Bofarull		1935	1935	CEDA / APC
102	Ramon Coll i Rodés		1935	1936	Lliga Catalana
103	Carles Pi i Sunyer (2)		1936	1937	ERC
104	Hilari Salvadó i Castell		1937	1939	ERC
105	Miquel Mateu i Pla		1939	1945	FET y de las JONS
106	Josep M. Albert i Despujol		1945	1951	FET y de las JONS
107	Antoni M. Simarro i Puig		1951	1957	FET y de las JONS
108	Josep Maria de Porcioles i Colomer		1957	1973	FET y de las JONS
109	Enric Massó i Vázquez		1973	1975	FET y de las JONS

=== Spanish transition to democracy ===
#	Name	Portrait	Birth and death	Term in office		Council election	Party affiliation
#	Name	Portrait	Birth and death	Started	Ended	Council election	Party affiliation
110	Joaquim Viola i Sauret		26 June 1913; Cebreros – 25 January 1978; Barcelona (aged 64)	18 September 1975	6 December 1976	Not held	FET y de las JONS
111	Josep Maria Socías i Humbert		23 August 1937; Barcelona – 3 November 2008; Barcelona (aged 71)	6 December 1976	2 January 1979 (2 years, 27 days)	Not held	FET y de las JONS
112	Manuel Font i Altaba (Interim)		1922; Barcelona – 2005; Barcelona (aged 83)	2 January 1979	19 April 1979 (107 days)	Not held	-
113	Narcís Serra		30 May 1943; Barcelona	19 April 1979	2 December 1982 (3 years, 227 days)	1979	Socialists' Party of Catalonia
114	Pasqual Maragall		13 January 1941; Barcelona	2 December 1982	26 September 1997 (14 years, 298 days)	1983; 1987; 1991; 1995	Socialists' Party of Catalonia
115	Joan Clos		29 June 1949; Parets del Vallès	26 September 1997	8 September 2006 (8 years, 347 days)	1999; 2003	Socialists' Party of Catalonia
116	Jordi Hereu		14 June 1965; Barcelona	8 September 2006	2 July 2011 (4 years, 297 days)	2007	Socialists' Party of Catalonia
117	Xavier Trias		5 August 1946; Barcelona	2 July 2011	13 June 2015 (3 years, 346 days)	2011	Democratic Convergence of Catalonia
118	Ada Colau		3 May 1974; Barcelona	13 June 2015	17 June 2023 (8 years, 4 days)	2015; 2019	Barcelona En Comú
119	Jaume Collboni		5 September 1969; Barcelona	17 June 2023	Incumbent (3 years, 82 days)	2023	Socialists' Party of Catalonia

== See also ==
- Timeline of Barcelona
- Provincial Deputation of Barcelona
- Generalitat de Catalunya
- Consell de Cent
