= Josep Maria Socías =

Spanish lawyer and politician

His Excellency Josep Maria Socias i Humbert

111th Mayor of Barcelona
- In office 6 December 1976 – 2 January 1979
- Preceded by: Joaquin Viola Sauret
- Succeeded by: Manuel Font i Altaba

Personal details
- Born: 23 August 1937 Barcelona, Spain
- Died: 3 November 2008 (aged 71) Barcelona, Spain

Josep María Socías i Humbert (23 August 1937 – 3 November 2008) was a Spanish lawyer and politician. He graduated from the University of Barcelona (UB) with a degree in law, and was named Mayor of Barcelona by King Juan Carlos I on 6 December 1976 .
