= 1979 Barcelona municipal election =

Election in the Spanish municipality of Barcelona

- 3 April 1979

All 43 seats in the City Council of Barcelona 22 seats needed for a majority
- Registered: 1,480,453
- Turnout: 803,419 (54.3%)
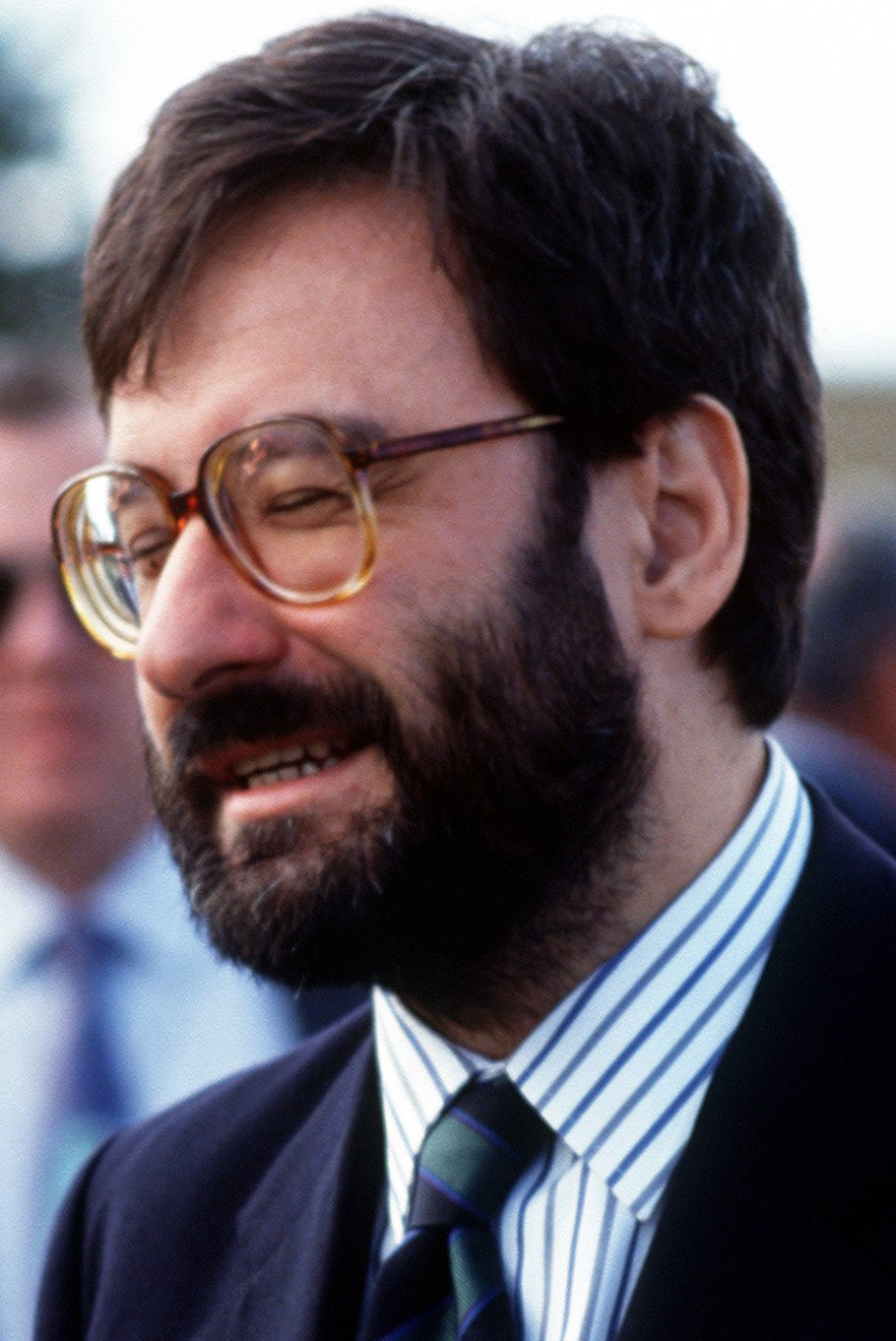

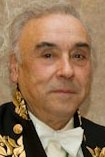
	First party	Second party	Third party
Leader	Narcís Serra	Josep Miquel Abad	Xavier Millet
Party	PSC–PSOE	PSUC	CiU
Leader since	5 February 1979	1979	5 February 1979
Seats won	16	9	8
Popular vote	272,512	151,288	148,806
Percentage	34.0%	18.9%	18.6%
	Fourth party	Fifth party
Leader	Carlos Güell de Sentmenat	Joan Hortalà
Party	CC–UCD	ERC
Leader since	1979	1979
Seats won	8	2
Popular vote	133,885	41,845
Percentage	16.7%	5.2%
Mayor before election
Manuel Font (acting)
Independent
Mayor after election
Narcís Serra
PSC

A municipal election was held in Barcelona on 3 April 1979 to elect the 1st City Council of the municipality. All 43 seats in the City Council were up for election. It was held concurrently with local elections all across Spain.

== Overview ==
Under the 1978 Constitution, the governance of municipalities in Spain—part of the country's local government system—was centered on the figure of city councils (Spanish: ayuntamientos), local corporations with independent legal personality composed of a mayor, a government council and an elected legislative assembly. The mayor was indirectly elected by the local assembly, requiring an absolute majority; otherwise, the candidate from the most-voted party automatically became mayor (ties were resolved by drawing lots). In the case of Barcelona, the top-tier administrative and governing body was the City Council of Barcelona.

=== Date ===
The term of local assemblies in Spain expired four years after the date of their previous election. The election decree was required to be issued no later than the day after the expiration date of the assemblies, with election day taking place 65 days after the decree's publication in the Official State Gazette (BOE).

Elections to the assemblies of local entities were officially called on 27 January 1979 with the publication of the corresponding decree in the BOE, setting election day for 3 April.

=== Electoral system ===
Voting for local assemblies was based on universal suffrage, comprising all Spanish nationals over 18 years of age, registered and residing in the municipality and with full civil and political rights.

Local councillors were elected using the D'Hondt method and closed-list proportional voting, with a five percent-threshold of valid votes (including blank ballots) in each municipality. Each municipality was a multi-member constituency, with a number of seats based on the following scale:

Population	Councillors
<250	5
251–1,000	7
1,001–2,000	9
2,001–5,000	11
5,001–10,000	13
10,001–20,000	17
20,001–50,000	21
50,001–100,000	25
>100,001	+1 per each 100,000 inhabitants or fraction +1 if total is an even number

The law did not provide for by-elections to fill vacant seats; instead, any vacancies arising after the proclamation of candidates and during the legislative term were filled by the next candidates on the party lists or, when required, by designated substitutes.

== Parties and candidates ==
The electoral law allowed for parties and federations registered in the interior ministry, alliances and groupings of electors to present lists of candidates. Parties and federations intending to form an alliance were required to inform the relevant electoral commission within 10 days of the election call, whereas groupings of electors needed to secure the signature of a determined amount of the electors registered in the municipality for which they sought election, disallowing electors from signing for more than one list. In the case of Barcelona, as its population was over 1,000,001, at least 5,000 signatures were required.

Below is a list of the main parties and alliances which contested the election:

Candidacy	Parties and alliances	Leading candidate	Ideology	Gov.	Ref.
PSC–PSOE	List: Socialists' Party of Catalonia (PSC–PSOE)	Narcís Serra	Social democracy	No	
CC–UCD	List: Centrists of Catalonia (CC–UCD)	Carlos Güell de Sentmenat	Centrism	No	
CiU	List: Democratic Convergence of Catalonia (CDC); Democratic Union of Catalonia (UDC)	Xavier Millet	Catalan nationalism Centrism	No	
PSUC	List: Unified Socialist Party of Catalonia (PSUC)	Josep Miquel Abad	Communism; Catalanism	No	
ERC	List: Republican Left of Catalonia (ERC)	Joan Hortalà	Catalan nationalism Left-wing nationalism Social democracy	No	

== Results ==
Summary of the 3 April 1979 City Council of Barcelona election results →
Parties and alliances	Popular vote			Seats	
Parties and alliances	Votes	%	±pp	Total	+/−
Socialists' Party of Catalonia (PSC–PSOE)	272,512	34.05	n/a	16	n/a
Unified Socialist Party of Catalonia (PSUC)	151,288	18.90	n/a	9	n/a
Convergence and Union (CiU)	148,806	18.59	n/a	8	n/a
Centrists of Catalonia (CC–UCD)	133,885	16.73	n/a	8	n/a
Republican Left of Catalonia–National Front of Catalonia (ERC–FNC)	41,845	5.23	n/a	2	n/a
Democratic Coalition (CD)	24,039	3.00	n/a	0	n/a
Workers' Party of Catalonia–Communist Unity (PTC–UC)	8,832	1.10	n/a	0	n/a
Communist Movement–Organization of Communist Left (MC–OEC)	4,259	0.53	n/a	0	n/a
Socialist Party of National Liberation (PSAN)	3,123	0.39	n/a	0	n/a
Social Christian Democracy of Catalonia (DSCC)	2,950	0.37	n/a	0	n/a
Revolutionary Communist League (LCR)	1,939	0.24	n/a	0	n/a
Catalan Left Bloc (BEC)	0	0.00	n/a	0	n/a
Democratic Municipal Action (AMD)	0	0.00	n/a	0	n/a
New Force (FN)	0	0.00	n/a	0	n/a
Republican Left (IR)	0	0.00	n/a	0	n/a
List for Workers' Courts (LCO)	0	0.00	n/a	0	n/a
Workers' Revolutionary Organization (ORT)	0	0.00	n/a	0	n/a
Blank ballots	2,547	0.32	n/a		
Total	800,428			43	n/a
Valid votes	800,428	99.63	n/a		
Invalid votes	2,991	0.37	n/a		
Votes cast / turnout	803,419	54.27	n/a		
Abstentions	677,034	45.73	n/a		
Registered voters	1,480,453				

Popular vote
PSC–PSOE	34.05%
PSUC	18.90%
CiU	18.59%
CC–UCD	16.73%
ERC–FNC	5.23%
CD	3.00%
PTC–UC	1.10%
Others	1.53%
Blank ballots	0.32%

Seats
PSC–PSOE	37.21%
PSUC	20.93%
CiU	18.60%
CC–UCD	18.60%
ERC–FNC	4.65%

== Aftermath ==
=== Government formation ===
Investiture
Ballot →	19 April 1979	
Required majority →	22 out of 43	
Narcís Serra (PSC): • PSC (16); • PSUC (9); • CiU (8); • ERC (2)	35 / 43	check
Carlos Güell de Sentmenat (CC–UCD): • CC–UCD (8)	8 / 43	X mark
Abstentions/Blank ballots	0 / 43	
Absentees	0 / 43	

=== 1982 investiture ===
Investiture
Ballot →	2 December 1982	
Required majority →	22 out of 43	
Pasqual Maragall (PSC): • PSC (16); • PSUC (9)	25 / 43	check
Abstentions/Blank ballots: • CiU (8); • CC–UCD (5); • ERC (2)	15 / 43	
Absentees: • CC–UCD (3)	3 / 43	

== Bibliography ==
- Decreto 1166/1960, de 23 de mayo, por el que se establece un régimen especial para el Municipio de Barcelona, conforme a lo autorizado por el artículo 94 de la vigente Ley de Régimen Local (PDF) (Decree 1166/1960). Official State Gazette (in Spanish). 23 May 1960. BOE-A-1960-9155.
- Ley 41/1975, de 19 de noviembre, de Bases del Estatuto de Régimen Local (Law 41/1975). Official State Gazette (in Spanish). 19 November 1975. BOE-A-1975-23920.
- Ley 39/1978, de 17 de julio, de elecciones locales (Law 39/1978). Official State Gazette (in Spanish). 17 July 1978. BOE-A-1978-18636.
- Constitución Española (Constitution). Official State Gazette (in Spanish). 27 December 1978 [version as of 29 December 1978]. BOE-A-1978-31229.
- Real Decreto 117/1979, de 26 de enero, de convocatoria de Elecciones Locales (Royal Decree 117/1979). Official State Gazette (in Spanish). 26 January 1979. BOE-A-1979-2570.
