= Francesc de Paula Rius i Taulet =

Francisco de Paula Rius y Taulet
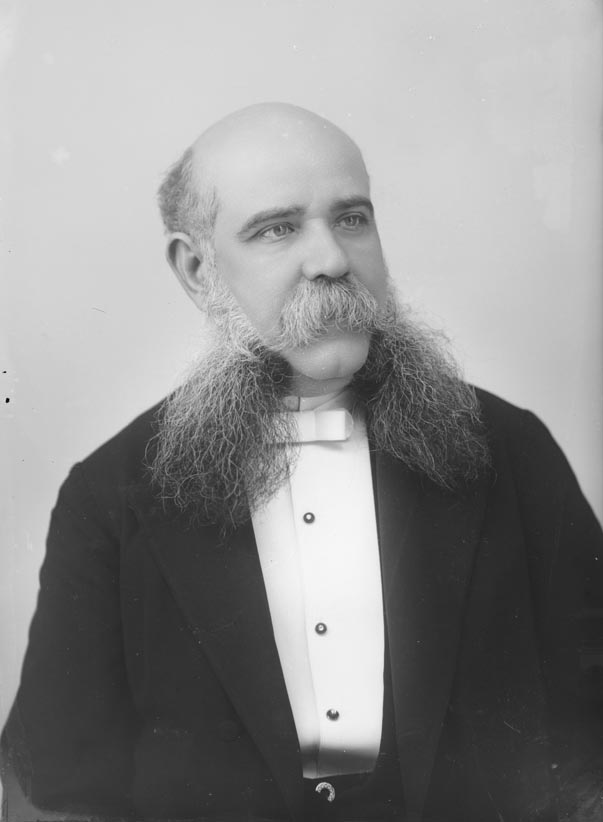
- Born: 1833; Barcelona
- Died: 1889 (aged 55–56); Olérdola
- Resting place: Cemetery of Montjuich.
- Occupation: Mayor of Barcelona

Francisco de Paula Rius y Taulet (Barcelona, 1833 - Olèrdola, 1889) was a Spanish lawyer and politician. He was mayor of Barcelona in four different non-consecutive periods during the Restoration between 1858 and 1889. He is regarded to be among the highest promoters of the 1888 Barcelona Universal Exposition and its related urbanistic reforms.

His son Manuel Rius y Rius was also mayor of Barcelona between 1916 and 1917. He is interred in the Montjuïc Cemetery in Barcelona.
