= Santiago Fisas =

Spanish politician

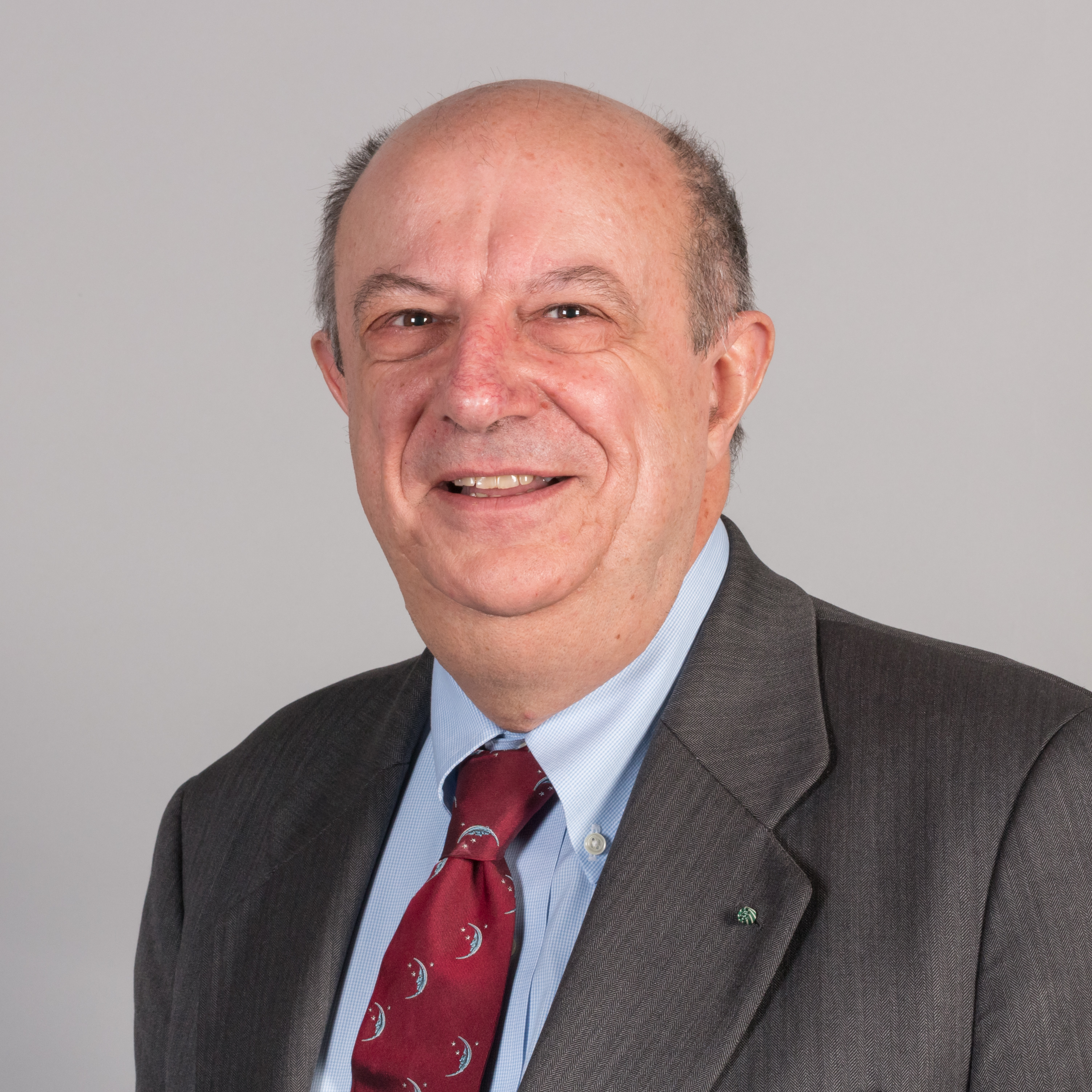

Santiago Fisas Ayxelà (also "Aixelás"; born 29 August 1948 in Barcelona) is a Spanish politician of the People's Party who served as a Member of the European Parliament from 2009 until 2019.

== Early life and education ==
Qualified in law, he previously served as Secretary of State for Sport, and Minister of Sport and Culture in the Community of Madrid, while also being a patron of the Barcelona Museum of Contemporary Art.

== Political career ==
Fisas was elected to the European Parliament after being put in the 23rd position in his party's list. During his first term from 2009 to 2014, he served on the Committee on Culture and Education. In 2014, he joined the Committee on International Trade.

Fisas led the 38-member EU-Election Observer Mission for the 2015 general election in Nigeria.

== Controversy ==
In February 2016, Fisas was investigated by the Guardia Civil for financial irregularities stemming from a concert staged at the Palacio de Deportes de la Comunidad de Madrid in March 2007.
