= 1983 Barcelona municipal election =

Election in the Spanish municipality of Barcelona

- 8 May 1983

All 43 seats in the City Council of Barcelona 22 seats needed for a majority
- Opinion polls
- Registered: 1,359,589 ▼8.2%
- Turnout: 916,684 (67.4%) ▲13.1 pp
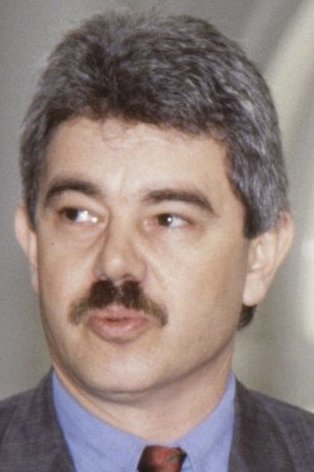

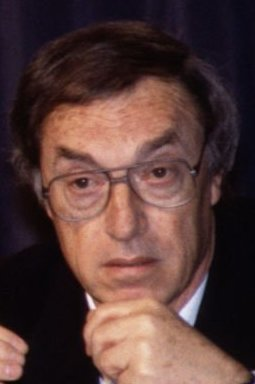
| | First party | Second party | Third party |
|---|---|---|---|
| Leader | Pasqual Maragall | Ramon Trias | Alexandre Pedrós |
| Party | PSC–PSOE | CiU | AP–PDP–UL |
| Leader since | 2 December 1982 | 1983 | 1983 |
| Last election | 16 seats, 34.0% | 8 seats, 18.6% | 0 seats, 3.0% (Note: Results for CD in the 1979 election.) |
| Seats won | 21 | 13 | 6 |
| Seat change | ▲5 | ▲5 | ▲6 |
| Popular vote | 412,991 | 246,780 | 117,052 |
| Percentage | 45.8% | 27.4% | 13.0% |
| Swing | ▲11.8 pp | ▲8.8 pp | ▲10.0 pp |
| | Fourth party |
| Leader | Jordi Solé Tura |
| Party | PSUC |
| Leader since | 1983 |
| Last election | 9 seats, 18.9% |
| Seats won | 3 |
| Seat change | ▼6 |
| Popular vote | 62,421 |
| Percentage | 6.9% |
| Swing | ▼12.0 pp |
Mayor before election
Pasqual Maragall
PSC
Mayor after election
Pasqual Maragall
PSC

A municipal election was held in Barcelona on 8 May 1983 to elect the 2nd City Council of the municipality. All 43 seats in the City Council were up for election. It was held concurrently with regional elections in thirteen autonomous communities and local elections all across Spain.

== Overview ==
Under the 1978 Constitution, the governance of municipalities in Spain—part of the country's local government system—was centered on the figure of city councils (Spanish: ayuntamientos), local corporations with independent legal personality composed of a mayor, a government council and an elected legislative assembly. The mayor was indirectly elected by the local assembly, requiring an absolute majority; otherwise, the candidate from the most-voted party automatically became mayor (ties were resolved by drawing lots). In the case of Barcelona, the top-tier administrative and governing body was the City Council of Barcelona.

=== Date ===
The term of local assemblies in Spain expired four years after the date of their previous election. The election decree was required to be issued no later than the day after the expiration date of the assemblies, with election day taking place within from 55 to 70 days after the decree's publication in the Official State Gazette (BOE).

Elections to the assemblies of local entities were officially called on 10 March 1983 with the publication of the corresponding decree in the BOE, setting election day for 8 May.

=== Electoral system ===
Voting for local assemblies was based on universal suffrage, comprising all Spanish nationals over 18 years of age, registered and residing in the municipality and with full civil and political rights.

Local councillors were elected using the D'Hondt method and closed-list proportional voting, with a five percent-threshold of valid votes (including blank ballots) in each municipality. Each municipality was a multi-member constituency, with a number of seats based on the following scale:

| Population | Councillors |
|---|---|
| <250 | 5 |
| 251–1,000 | 7 |
| 1,001–2,000 | 9 |
| 2,001–5,000 | 11 |
| 5,001–10,000 | 13 |
| 10,001–20,000 | 17 |
| 20,001–50,000 | 21 |
| 50,001–100,000 | 25 |
| >100,001 | +1 per each 100,000 inhabitants or fraction +1 if total is an even number |

The law did not provide for by-elections to fill vacant seats; instead, any vacancies arising after the proclamation of candidates and during the legislative term were filled by the next candidates on the party lists or, when required, by designated substitutes.

== Opinion polls ==
The tables below list opinion polling results in reverse chronological order, showing the most recent first and using the dates when the survey fieldwork was done, as opposed to the date of publication. Where the fieldwork dates are unknown, the date of publication is given instead. The highest percentage figure in each polling survey is displayed with its background shaded in the leading party's colour. If a tie ensues, this is applied to the figures with the highest percentages. The "Lead" column on the right shows the percentage-point difference between the parties with the highest percentages in a poll.

=== Voting intention estimates ===
The table below lists weighted voting intention estimates. Refusals are generally excluded from the party vote percentages, while question wording and the treatment of "don't know" responses and those not intending to vote may vary between polling organisations. When available, seat projections determined by the polling organisations are also displayed below (or in place of) the voting estimates in a smaller font; 22 seats were required for an absolute majority in the City Council of Barcelona.

| Polling firm/Commissioner | Fieldwork date | Sample size | Turnout | PSC | PSUC | CiU | CC–UCD | ERC | AP–PDP–PL | Lead |
|---|---|---|---|---|---|---|---|---|---|---|
| 1983 municipal election | 8 May 1983 | —N/a | 67.4 | 45.8; 21 | 6.9; 3 | 27.4; 13 | – | 3.9; 0 | 13.0; 6 | 18.4 |
| Sofemasa/El País | 23–26 Apr 1983 | ? | ? | 43.7; 20/21 | 8.9; 4/5 | 22.1; 11/12 | – | 5.6; 2 | 11.0; 5 | 21.6 |
| 1982 general election | 28 Oct 1982 | —N/a | 81.0 | 40.9 (22) | 4.5 (0) | 23.3 (12) | 1.6 (0) | 4.5 (0) | 18.6 (Note: Results for CD (1979), SC (1980) and AP–PDP (1982).) (9) | 17.6 |
| 1980 regional election | 20 Mar 1980 | —N/a | 57.9 | 20.9 (10) | 16.1 (8) | 28.7 (15) | 10.2 (5) | 10.8 (5) | 3.9; 0 | 7.8 |
| 1979 municipal election | 3 Apr 1979 | —N/a | 54.3 | 34.0; 16 | 18.9; 9 | 18.6; 8 | 16.7; 8 | 5.2; 2 | 3.0; 0 | 15.1 |

=== Voting preferences ===
The table below lists raw, unweighted voting preferences.

| Polling firm/Commissioner | Fieldwork date | Sample size | PSC | PSUC | CiU | CC–UCD | ERC | AP–PDP–PL | CDS | Question | X mark | Lead |
|---|---|---|---|---|---|---|---|---|---|---|---|---|
| 1983 municipal election | 8 May 1983 | —N/a | 30.4 | 4.6 | 18.2 | – | 2.6 | 8.6 | 0.6 | —N/a | 32.6 | 12.2 |
| Alef–Emopública/CIS | 17–25 Mar 1983 | 517 | 41.6 | 3.3 | 11.1 | – | 2.1 | 4.8 | 0.2 | 26.2 | 7.0 | 30.5 |
| 1982 general election | 28 Oct 1982 | —N/a | 32.8 | 3.6 | 18.7 | 1.3 | 3.6 | 14.9 | 1.9 | —N/a | 19.0 | 14.1 |
| 1980 regional election | 20 Mar 1980 | —N/a | 12.0 | 9.3 | 16.5 | 5.9 | 6.2 | 2.2 | – | —N/a | 42.1 | 4.5 |
| 1979 municipal election | 3 Apr 1979 | —N/a | 18.4 | 10.2 | 10.1 | 9.0 | 2.8 | 1.6 | – | —N/a | 45.7 | 8.2 |

== Results ==
← Summary of the 8 May 1983 City Council of Barcelona election results →
| Parties and alliances | Popular vote | | | Seats | |
| Parties and alliances | Votes | % | ±pp | Total | +/− |
|---|---|---|---|---|---|
| Socialists' Party of Catalonia (PSC–PSOE) | 412,991 | 45.80 | +11.75 | 21 | +5 |
| Convergence and Union (CiU) | 246,780 | 27.37 | +8.78 | 13 | +5 |
| People's Coalition (AP–PDP–UL)^{1} | 117,052 | 12.98 | +9.98 | 6 | +6 |
| Unified Socialist Party of Catalonia (PSUC) | 62,421 | 6.92 | −11.98 | 3 | −6 |
| Republican Left of Catalonia (ERC) | 34,777 | 3.86 | −1.37 | 0 | −2 |
| Party of the Communists of Catalonia (PCC) | 9,653 | 1.07 | New | 0 | ±0 |
| Democratic and Social Centre (CDS) | 8,518 | 0.94 | New | 0 | ±0 |
| Workers' Socialist Party (PST) | 2,699 | 0.30 | New | 0 | ±0 |
| Spanish Phalanx of the CNSO (FE–JONS) | 1,194 | 0.13 | New | 0 | ±0 |
| Revolutionary Workers' Party of Spain (PORE) | 864 | 0.10 | New | 0 | ±0 |
| Popular Struggle Coalition (CLP) | 848 | 0.09 | New | 0 | ±0 |
| Conservatives of Catalonia (CiC) | 0 | 0.00 | New | 0 | ±0 |
| Centrists of Catalonia (CC–UCD) | n/a | n/a | −16.73 | 0 | −8 |
| Blank ballots | 3,847 | 0.43 | +0.11 | | |
| Total | 901,644 | | | 43 | ±0 |
| Valid votes | 901,644 | 98.36 | −1.27 | | |
| Invalid votes | 15,040 | 1.64 | +1.27 | | |
| Votes cast / turnout | 916,684 | 67.42 | +13.15 | | |
| Abstentions | 442,905 | 32.58 | −13.15 | | |
| Registered voters | 1,359,589 | | | | |
Sources
Footnotes: ^{1} People's Coalition results are compared to Democratic Coalition totals in the 1979 election.

Popular vote
| PSC–PSOE | 45.80% |
| CiU | 27.37% |
| AP–PDP–UL | 12.98% |
| PSUC | 6.92% |
| ERC | 3.86% |
| PCC | 1.07% |
| Others | 1.57% |
| Blank ballots | 0.43% |

Seats
| PSC–PSOE | 48.84% |
| CiU | 30.23% |
| AP–PDP–UL | 13.95% |
| PSUC | 6.98% |

== Bibliography ==
- Decreto 1166/1960, de 23 de mayo, por el que se establece un régimen especial para el Municipio de Barcelona, conforme a lo autorizado por el artículo 94 de la vigente Ley de Régimen Local (PDF) (Decree 1166/1960). Official State Gazette (in Spanish). 23 May 1960. BOE-A-1960-9155.
- Ley 41/1975, de 19 de noviembre, de Bases del Estatuto de Régimen Local (Law 41/1975). Official State Gazette (in Spanish). 19 November 1975. BOE-A-1975-23920.
- Ley 39/1978, de 17 de julio, de elecciones locales (Law 39/1978). Official State Gazette (in Spanish). 17 July 1978. BOE-A-1978-18636.
- Constitución Española (Constitution). Official State Gazette (in Spanish). 27 December 1978 [version as of 29 December 1978]. BOE-A-1978-31229.
- Ley Orgánica 6/1983, de 2 de marzo, por la que se modifican determinados artículos de la Ley 39/1978, de 17 de julio, de Elecciones Locales (Organic Law 6/1983). Official State Gazette (in Spanish). 2 March 1983. BOE-A-1983-6573.
- Real Decreto 448/1983, de 9 de marzo, de convocatoria de Elecciones Locales (Royal Decree 448/1983). Official State Gazette (in Spanish). 9 March 1983. BOE-A-1983-7296.
