= Joaquim Molins i Amat =

Spanish politician

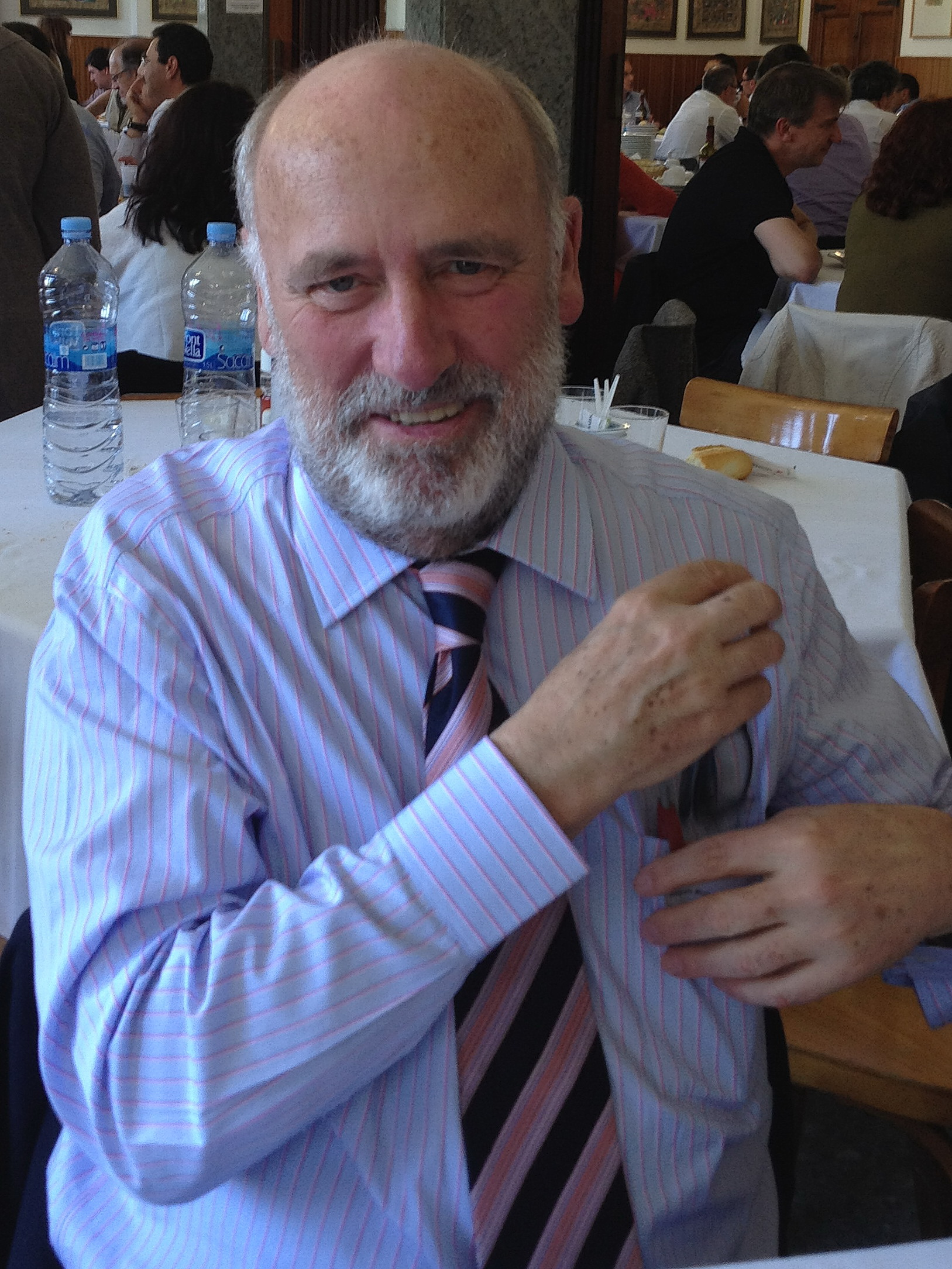
- Joaquim Molins i Amat, 2014

Personal details
- Born: 9 February 1945
- Died: 13 July 2017 (aged 72)

Joaquim Molins i Amat (9 February 1945 – 13 July 2017) was a Spanish politician who was a member of the Congress of Deputies and the Parliament of Catalonia. He died on 13 July 2017 of complications from pancreatic cancer.
