= Partit per la Independència =

Party for Independence Partit per la Independència
- President: Àngel Colom i Colom
- Secretary-General: Benet Tugues i Boliart
- Founded: 1990
- Dissolved: 1999
- Split from: Republican Left of Catalonia
- Merged into: Democratic Convergence of Catalonia
- Ideology: Catalan independence

Partit per la Independència (PI; Catalan pronunciation: [pəɾˈtit pəɾ lə indəpənˈdɛnsiə]) was a short lived political party in Catalonia of the 1990s that campaigned for independence for Catalonia from Spain. It was created by Àngel Colom and Pilar Rahola in 1996 as a schism from Republican Left of Catalonia, another independentist party. After the meager electoral results in municipal elections in 1999, particularly in Barcelona city where Rahola was candidate, Partit per la Independència was dissolved. Afterwards, Colom and most of the party direction integrated into Convergència Democràtica de Catalunya. Joan Laporta, later president of Futbol Club Barcelona, was member of PI.
