= Pilar Rahola =

Spanish journalist and politician (born 1958)

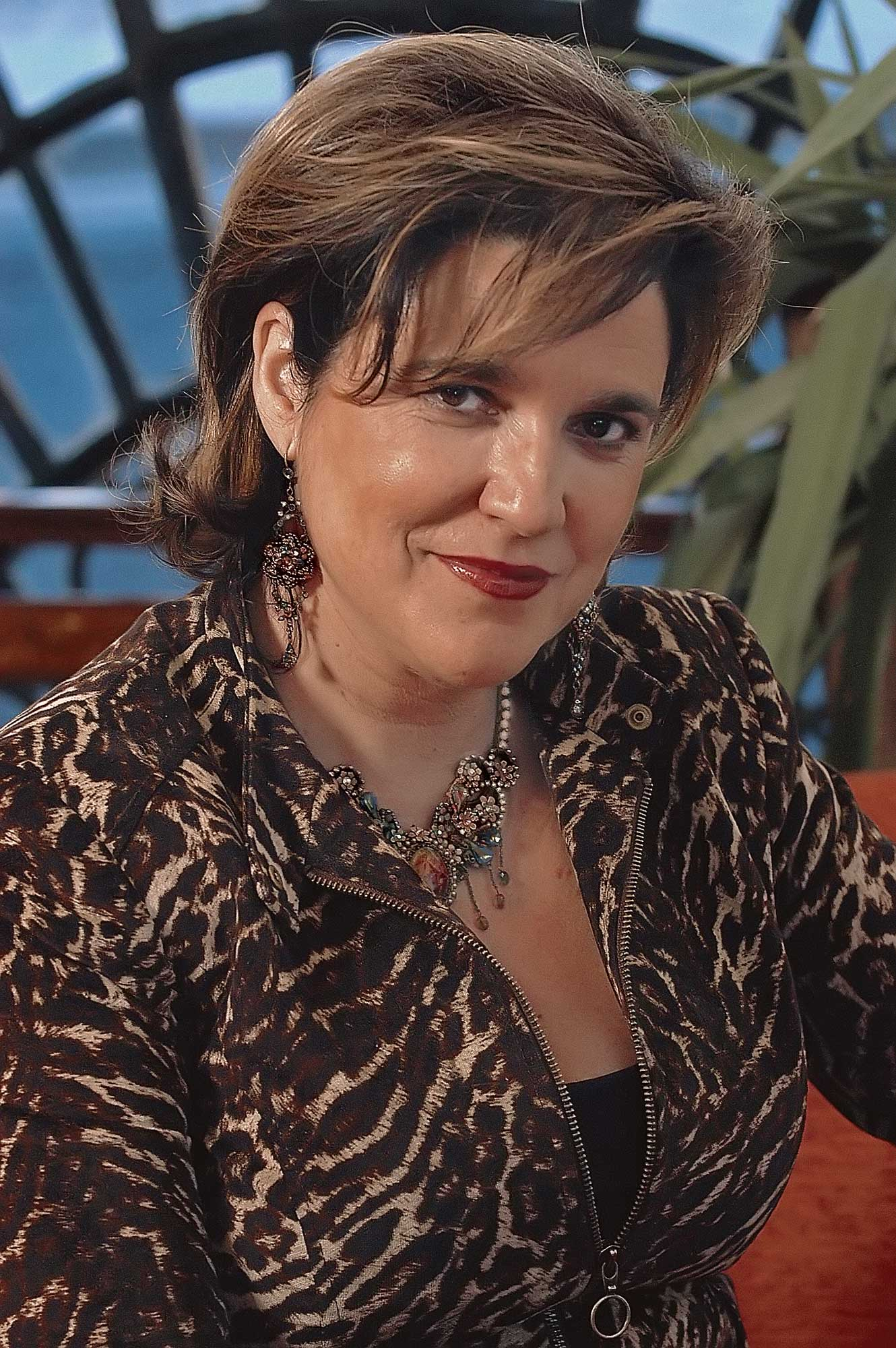
Pilar Rahola.

Pilar Rahola i Martínez (Catalan pronunciation: [piˈla rəˈɔlə]; Barcelona, 21 October 1958) is a Spanish writer, political analyst and former politician and MP.

== Career ==
Rahola studied Spanish and Catalan Philology at the Universitat de Barcelona. She has published several books in Spanish and Catalan, and she is a columnist at La Vanguardia in Spain, and collaborated with conservative newspapers such as La Nación in Argentina, and Diario de América in the United States. She appears frequently on television and has taken part in several university lectures.

She comes from a republican and anti-fascist family, and several of her relatives have been politicians or writers: Pere Rahola, a conservative minister of the navy of the republic (belonging to the 'Lliga Catalanista' nationalist party); Frederic Rahola, first Síndic de Greuges (public defender) in the Generalitat de Catalunya; and Carles Rahola, a writer executed by Francoists. Rahola is married and has three children, two of them adopted: one from Barcelona, the others from Siberia.

From 1987 to 1990, Rahola was director of the Catalan publishing house Pòrtic, and as a journalist, she was involved in covering the Eritrean-Ethiopian War, the Balkan Wars, the Gulf War, and the fall of the Berlin Wall.

As a politician, she was the only member of Esquerra Republicana de Catalunya in Spanish Congress of Deputies representing Barcelona Province in the 5th and 6th Spanish legislatures from 1993 to 2000, as well as serving as vice-mayor of Barcelona city. She also participated in several committees of investigation, especially those related to political corruption such as the comisión Roldán.

In 1996, Rahola left Esquerra Republicana de Catalunya to join Àngel Colom and Joan Laporta in a new political group, the "Partit per la Independència", but after this failed she decided to concentrate on journalism and writing. Her areas of interest include women's rights, international human rights, and animal rights. In recent years, she has spoken of what she considers to be the hypocrisy of left wing politicians who do not share her views with regard to Israel and Zionism.

In 2013, the Jewish National Fund planted a forest with 2,500 trees in her honor in Yatir, in the Negev.

Since 2013, she has been a member of the Catalonia's National Transition, official Committee of the Catalan government who works for a referendum on self-determination of Catalonia. She is a strong supporter for Catalan's right of self-determination and independence.

In June 2026, the provincial prosecutor's office of Barcelona announced that a preliminary investigation had been opened into Rahola over allegations of incitement to hatred and complicity in the ongoing genocide in the Gaza Strip. The investigation stemmed from a criminal complaint filed by two pro-Palestine activists, who stated that her statements in support of Israel "[promoted] a hate discourse that dehumanizes the victims and whitewashes the perpetrators of genocide, contributing to the creation of a climate of hostility against the Palestinian population". The complaint claimed that Rahola denied the genocide in Gaza and questioned the death toll in Gaza on X. Rahola also once wrote an article stating that: "If Israel had wanted to commit genocide, it would have taken three days, not three years." On 22 September 2026 the Public Prosecutor's Office closed the case without pursuing any action, finding that Rahola's statements did not rise to the level of incitement to hatred.

== Written works ==
- Aquell estiu color de vent – Editorial Pòrtic, 1983. (ISBN 84-7306-208-6)
- Color de verano – Editorial Pòrtic, 1983. (ISBN 84-7306-208-6)
- Aperitiu nocturn – Editorial Pòrtic, 1985. (ISBN 84-7306-260-4)
- La qüestió catalana – Editorial Columna, 1993. (ISBN 84-7809-515-2)
- Mujer liberada, hombre cabreado – Editorial Planeta, 2000. (ISBN 84-08-03499-5)
- Dona alliberada, home emprenyat – Editorial Planeta, 2000. (ISBN 84-08-03477-4)
- Carta a mi hijo adoptado – Editorial Planeta, 2001. (ISBN 84-08-03886-9)
- L'adopció un acte d'amor – Editorial Columna, 2001. ((ISBN 84-8300-760-6))
- Carta ao meu filho adoptado – Editorial Ambar 2003. (ISBN 972-43-0654-2)
- Historia de Ada – Editorial RandomHouse Mondadori, 2002. (ISBN 84-9759-023-6)
- 3x1: El món actual a través de 3 generacions – Editorial Plaza & James, 2003. (ISBN 84-01-38626-8)
- Catalunya, any zero – Editorial Ara llibres, 2004. (ISBN 84-96201-16-3)
- A favor de Israel - Editorial Certeza (2005). (ISBN 84-96219-20-8)
- La màscara del Rei Artur. Editorial La Magrana (2010)
- El carrer de l´Embut. Editorial RBA libros (2013). (ISBN 9788482646299).
- La República Islámica de España. Editorial RBA libros (2011). ISBN 978-84-9867-986-1
- Mariona. Editorial RBA libros (2015). (ISBN 9788482647371)
- Basta (about The threat of jihadism) RBA libros (2016). (ISBN 9788490566671)
- Rosa de cendra. Editorial Planeta. (2017). (ISBN 978-84-664-2225-3)
- Rosa de ceniza. Editorial Planeta (2017). (ISBN 9788408169925)

== Prizes ==
- Doctor honoris causa in Universidad de Artes y Ciencias de la Comunicación de Santiago de Chile, 2004, for her fight in favour of human rights
- Premio Javer Olam (2004), given by Jewish Chilean Community for her fight against antisemitism
- Cicla Price (2005), given for her fight against antisemitism
- Honour Member of University of Tel Aviv, 2006
- Golden Menora Price 2006, with Simone Weil, given by French B'nai B'rith
- Scopus Award laureate 2007, given by the Hebrew University of Jerusalem
- APEI Prize for her articles, given by "Asociación Profesional Española de Informadores de Prensa, Radio y Televisión"
- Honoured guest at the AIPAC's Policy Conference, 2008
- Senador Angel Pulido, 2009, given by "Federación de Comunidades Judías de España"
- Mass Media Award, 2009, given by American Jewish Committee, for her fight bias to Human Rights
- Daniel Pearl Award, 2010, given by Anti-Defamation League, "for her dedicated commitment to an honest and accountable journalistic code of ethics and for speaking honestly to the public"
- Morris Abram Human Rights Award, given by UN Watch for her defense of Human Rights . Geneva, 2011.
- Samuel Hadas Award 2012, gained with Felipe Gonzalez, José Maria Aznar and Jordi Pujol, and awarded by The Israeli Embassy for the struggle towards good relationships between Jewish people and Spanish people.
- In 2013 the Jewish National Fund planted a forest with 2,500 trees in her honor in Yatir, in the Negev
- In 2014, the Catalan Police Corps, the Mossos d'Esquadra, awarded it with the distinctive "Mossa d'Honor" .21 It is also distinguished by the distinction of the Forum Carlemany, a grouping of Catalan businessmen.
- In 2017 She won the Ramon Llull de les Lletres Catalanes prize, awarded by Planeta, the most important prize in Catalan literature, for her novel Rosa de Cendra

== Fake PhD Scandal ==
Until the summer of 2013, the English and Spanish version of Pilar Rahola's CV on her website claimed that she had received a PhD in Spanish and Catalan Philology from the University of Barcelona. This title was used when introducing her in countless prizes, television interviews and books. During 10 years she never corrected this information even though she had only received a bachelor's degree. When this misinformation was brought to her attention she claimed it was due an error when translating her original Catalan CV.
