= 2007 Barcelona municipal election =

Election in the Spanish municipality of Barcelona

- 27 May 2007

All 41 seats in the City Council of Barcelona 21 seats needed for a majority
- Opinion polls
- Registered: 1,234,368 ▼3.7%
- Turnout: 612,509 (49.6%) ▼9.6 pp
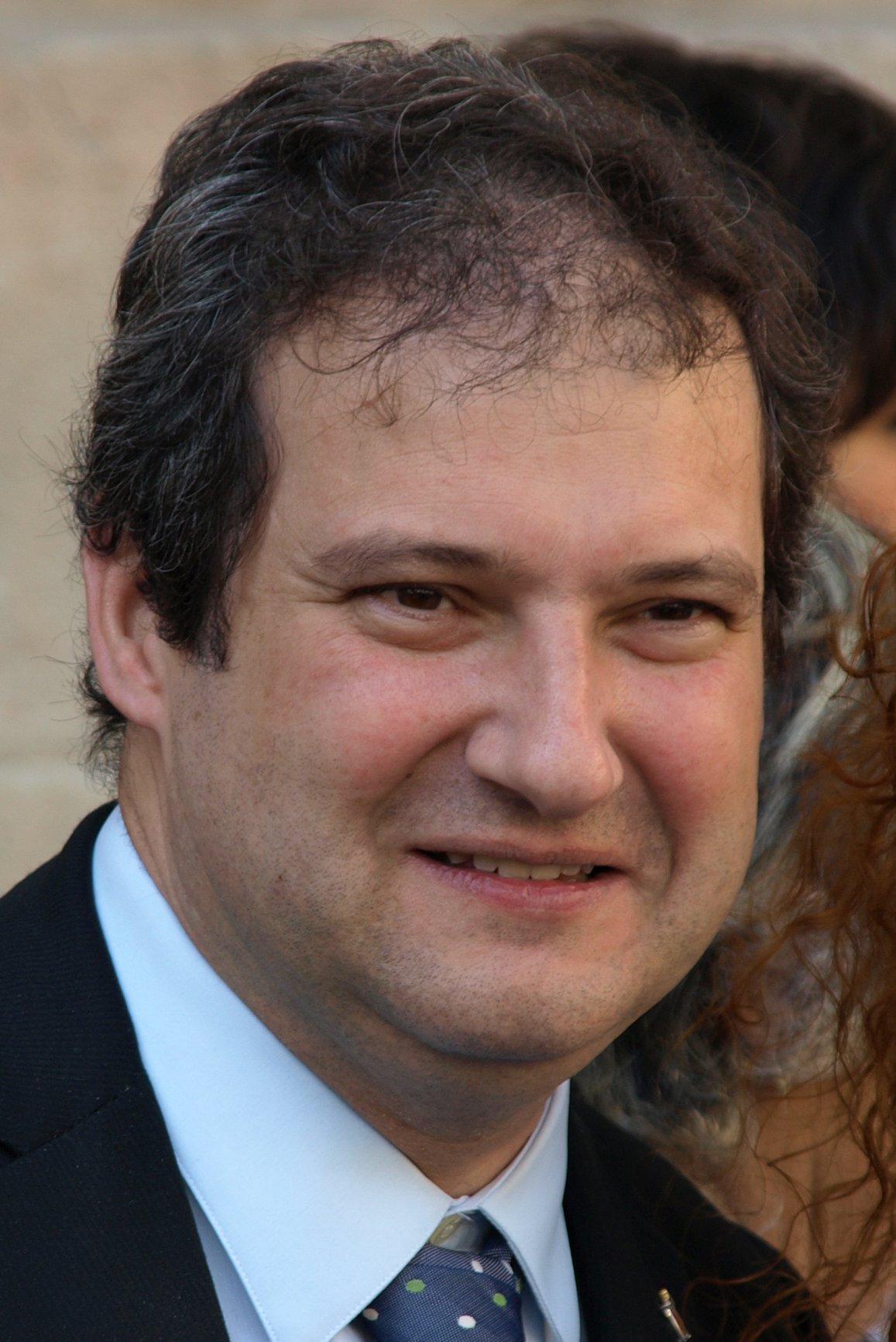

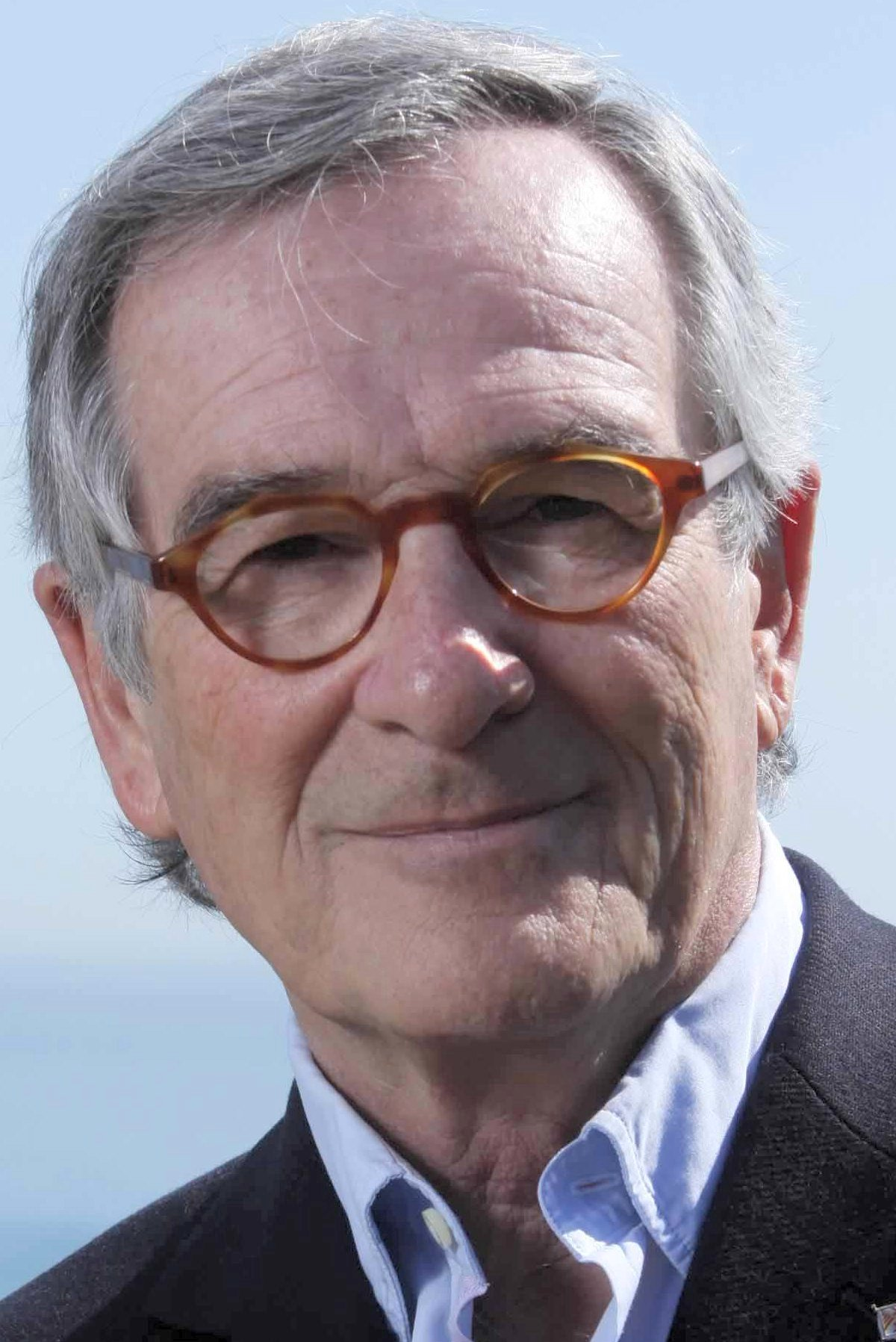

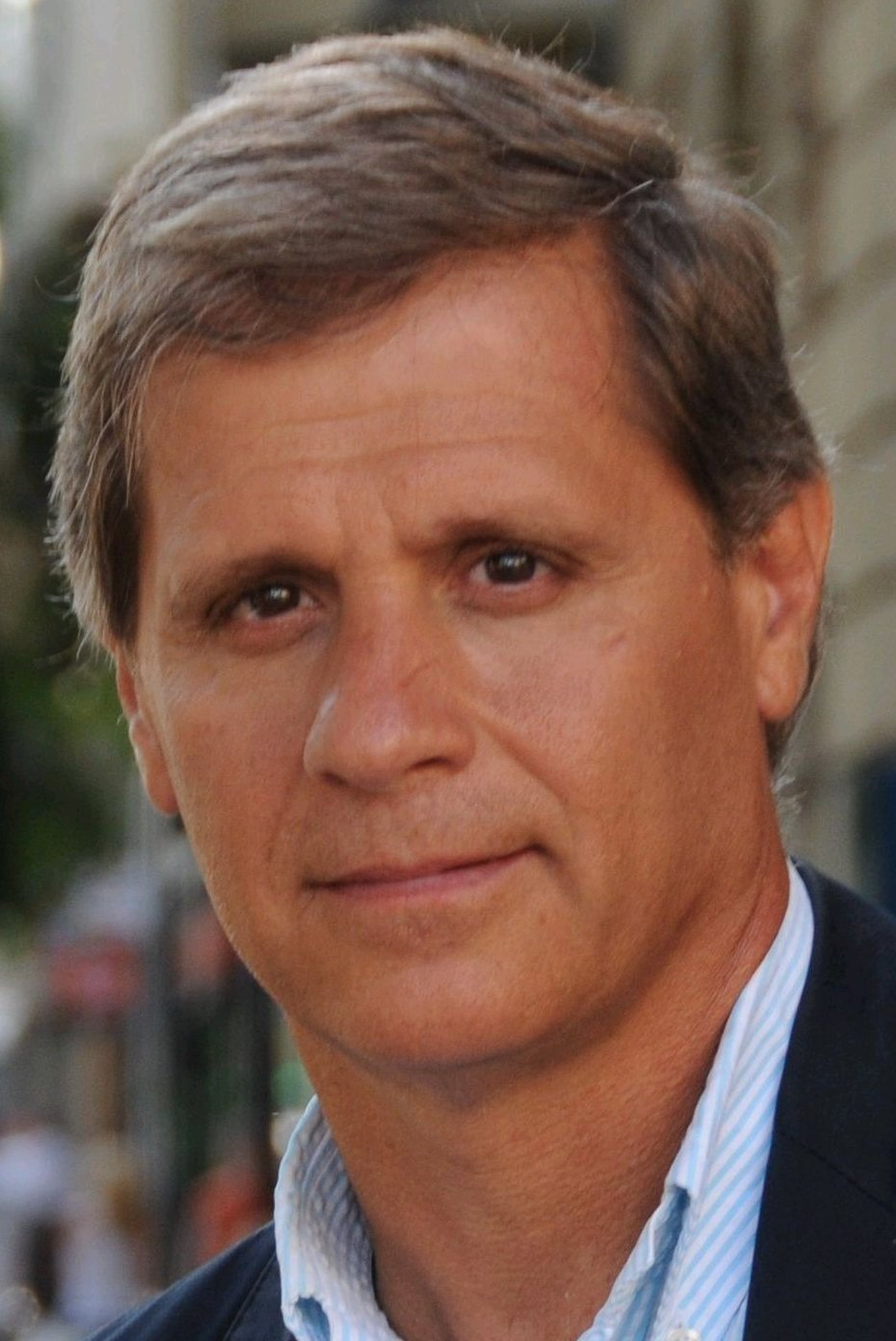

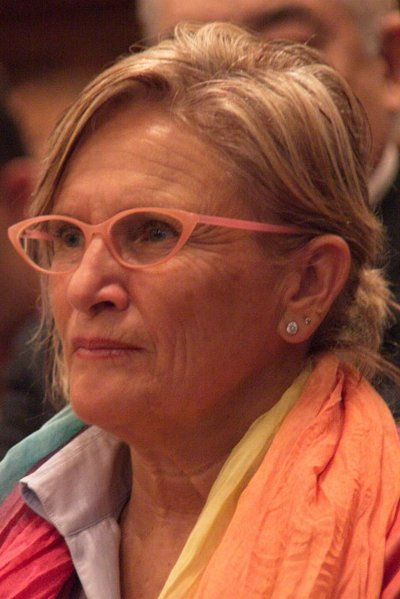

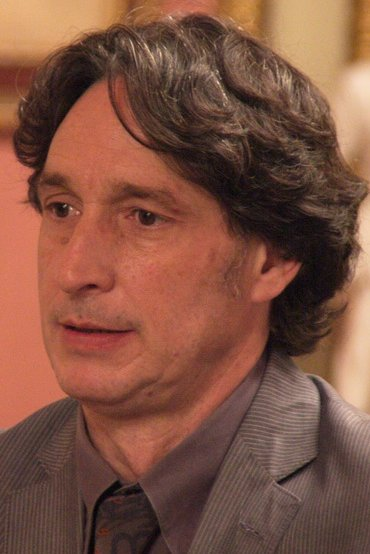
	First party	Second party	Third party
Leader	Jordi Hereu	Xavier Trias	Alberto Fernández Díaz
Party	PSC–PM	CiU	PP
Leader since	8 September 2006	17 May 2002	17 July 2002
Last election	15 seats, 33.6%	9 seats, 21.4%	7 seats, 16.1%
Seats won	14	12	7
Seat change	▼1	▲3	0
Popular vote	182,216	155,101	95,083
Percentage	29.9%	25.5%	15.6%
Swing	▼3.7 pp	▲4.1 pp	▼0.5 pp
	Fourth party	Fifth party
Leader	Imma Mayol	Jordi Portabella
Party	ICV–EUiA–EPM	ERC–AM
Leader since	1998	16 May 1998
Last election	5 seats, 12.1%	5 seats, 12.8%
Seats won	4	4
Seat change	▼1	▼1
Popular vote	56,953	53,707
Percentage	9.3%	8.8%
Swing	▼2.8 pp	▼4.0 pp
Mayor before election
Jordi Hereu
PSC
Mayor after election
Jordi Hereu
PSC

A municipal election was held in Barcelona on 27 May 2007 to elect the 8th City Council of the municipality. All 41 seats in the City Council were up for election. It was held concurrently with regional elections in thirteen autonomous communities and local elections all across Spain.

== Overview ==
Under the 1978 Constitution, the governance of municipalities in Spain—part of the country's local government system—was centered on the figure of city councils (Spanish: ayuntamientos), local corporations with independent legal personality composed of a mayor, a government council and an elected legislative assembly. The mayor was indirectly elected by the local assembly, requiring an absolute majority; otherwise, the candidate from the most-voted party automatically became mayor (ties were resolved by drawing lots). In the case of Barcelona, the top-tier administrative and governing body was the City Council of Barcelona.

=== Date ===
The term of local assemblies in Spain expired four years after the date of their previous election, with election day being fixed for the fourth Sunday of May every four years. The election decree was required to be issued no later than 54 days before the scheduled election date and published on the following day in the Official State Gazette (BOE). The previous local elections were held on 25 May 2003, setting the date for election day on the fourth Sunday of May four years later, which was 27 May 2007.

Local assemblies could not be dissolved before the expiration of their term, except in cases of mismanagement that seriously harmed the public interest and implied a breach of constitutional obligations, in which case the Council of Ministers could—optionally—decide to call a by-election.

Elections to the assemblies of local entities were officially called on 3 April 2007 with the publication of the corresponding decree in the BOE, setting election day for 27 May.

=== Electoral system ===
Voting for local assemblies was based on universal suffrage, comprising all Spanish nationals over 18 years of age, registered and residing in the municipality and with full political rights (provided that they had not been deprived of the right to vote by a final sentence, nor were legally incapacitated), as well as resident non-national European citizens, and those whose country of origin allowed reciprocal voting by virtue of a treaty.

Local councillors were elected using the D'Hondt method and closed-list proportional voting, with a five percent-threshold of valid votes (including blank ballots) in each municipality. Each municipality was a multi-member constituency, with a number of seats based on the following scale:

Population	Councillors
<250	5
251–1,000	7
1,001–2,000	9
2,001–5,000	11
5,001–10,000	13
10,001–20,000	17
20,001–50,000	21
50,001–100,000	25
>100,001	+1 per each 100,000 inhabitants or fraction +1 if total is an even number

The law did not provide for by-elections to fill vacant seats; instead, any vacancies arising after the proclamation of candidates and during the legislative term were filled by the next candidates on the party lists or, when required, by designated substitutes.

== Parties and candidates ==
The electoral law allowed for parties and federations registered in the interior ministry, alliances and groupings of electors to present lists of candidates. Parties and federations intending to form an alliance were required to inform the relevant electoral commission within 10 days of the election call, whereas groupings of electors needed to secure the signature of a determined amount of the electors registered in the municipality for which they sought election, disallowing electors from signing for more than one list. In the case of Barcelona, as its population was over 1,000,001, at least 8,000 signatures were required. Amendments earlier in 2007 required a balanced composition of men and women in the electoral lists, so that candidates of either sex made up at least 40 percent of the total composition.

Below is a list of the main parties and alliances which contested the election:

Candidacy	Parties and alliances	Leading candidate	Ideology	Previous result		Gov.	Ref.
Candidacy	Parties and alliances	Leading candidate	Ideology	Vote %	Seats	Gov.	Ref.
PSC–PM	List: Socialists' Party of Catalonia (PSC–PSOE)	Jordi Hereu	Social democracy	33.6%	15	Yes	
CiU	List: Convergence and Union (CiU) – Democratic Convergence of Catalonia (CDC) – Democratic Union of Catalonia (UDC)	Xavier Trias	Catalan nationalism Centrism	21.4%	9	No	
PP	List: People's Party (PP)	Alberto Fernández Díaz	Conservatism; Christian democracy	16.1%	7	No	
ERC–AM	List: Republican Left of Catalonia (ERC)	Jordi Portabella	Catalan independence Left-wing nationalism Social democracy	12.8%	5	Yes	
ICV– EUiA–EPM	List: Initiative for Catalonia Greens (ICV); United and Alternative Left (EUiA) – Party of the Communists of Catalonia (PCC) – Living Unified Socialist Party of Catalonia (PSUC viu) – Revolutionary Workers' Party (POR)	Imma Mayol	Regionalism; Eco-socialism; Green politics	12.1%	5	Yes	
C's	List: Citizens–Party of the Citizenry (C's)	Esperanza García	Liberalism	Did not contest		No	

Incumbent Joan Clos had initially intended to run for re-election, but his appointment as minister of Industry in the government of Spain under José Luis Rodríguez Zapatero saw Jordi Hereu becoming new mayor in September 2006.

== Opinion polls ==
The tables below list opinion polling results in reverse chronological order, showing the most recent first and using the dates when the survey fieldwork was done, as opposed to the date of publication. Where the fieldwork dates are unknown, the date of publication is given instead. The highest percentage figure in each polling survey is displayed with its background shaded in the leading party's colour. If a tie ensues, this is applied to the figures with the highest percentages. The "Lead" column on the right shows the percentage-point difference between the parties with the highest percentages in a poll.

=== Voting intention estimates ===
The table below lists weighted voting intention estimates. Refusals are generally excluded from the party vote percentages, while question wording and the treatment of "don't know" responses and those not intending to vote may vary between polling organisations. When available, seat projections determined by the polling organisations are displayed below (or in place of) the percentages in a smaller font; 21 seats were required for an absolute majority in the City Council of Barcelona.

Color key:

Exit poll

Polling firm/Commissioner	Fieldwork date	Sample size	Turnout	PSC	CiU	PP	ERC	ICV–EUiA	C's	Lead
2007 municipal election	27 May 2007	—N/a	49.6	29.9; 14	25.5; 12	15.6; 7	8.8; 4	9.3; 4	3.9; 0	4.4
Ipsos/RTVE–FORTA	27 May 2007	?	?	30.0; 14/16	24.0; 11/13	13.4; 6/7	9.9; 4/5	9.9; 3/4	–	6.0
Opina/El País	16 May 2007	600	?	36.0; 15/16	22.0; 9/10	15.0; 6	11.5; 5	11.5; 5	–	14.0
Opina/La Vanguardia	7–16 May 2007	600	?	34.9; 15/16	24.5; 10/11	13.4; 6	9.9; 4	12.3; 5	3.5; 0	10.4
GESOP/El Periódico	9–11 May 2007	800	?	34.1; 15/16	23.3; 10/11	13.9; 6	10.1; 4/5	12.2; 5/6	2.6; 0	10.8
Sigma Dos/El Mundo	2–9 May 2007	500	?	38.5; 17	22.7; 10	18.2; 8	7.5; 3	7.7; 3	–	15.8
TNS Demoscopia/Antena 3	8 May 2007	?	?	? 15/16	? 10/11	? 7	? 4/5	? 5/6	–	?
Opina/Cadena SER	7 May 2007	800	?	36.9; 15/16	22.9; 10/11	15.0; 6	12.0; 5	9.6; 4	2.0; 0	14.0
CIS	9–29 Apr 2007	991	?	32.0; 14	21.9; 9/10	13.2; 5/6	14.0; 6	13.3; 6	2.7; 0	10.1
GESOP/El Periódico	3 Mar 2007	?	50	33.0; 14/15	24.0; 10/11	? 7	11.5; 5	? 4	2.0; 0	9.0
2006 regional election	1 Nov 2006	—N/a	60.6	24.3 (11)	29.5 (14)	13.3 (6)	12.1 (5)	12.0 (5)	4.5 (0)	5.2
GAPS/CiU	18–28 Sep 2006	800	?	27.0– 28.0; 12/13	27.6– 28.6; 12/13	? 6/7	? 4/5	? 5/6	–	0.6
GAPS/CiU	29 Nov 2005	800	?	26.0; 12	25.0; 11	17.0; 7/8	14.0; 5/6	12.0; 5	–	1.0
2004 EP election	13 Jun 2004	—N/a	43.7	40.1 (17)	16.1 (7)	21.9 (9)	10.3 (4)	9.1 (4)	–	18.2
2004 general election	14 Mar 2004	—N/a	77.9	38.1 (16)	20.0 (8)	18.1 (8)	14.6 (6)	6.9 (3)	–	18.1
2003 regional election	16 Nov 2003	—N/a	66.7	30.6 (13)	28.0 (12)	15.2 (6)	15.6 (7)	8.5 (3)	–	2.6
2003 municipal election	25 May 2003	—N/a	59.2	33.6; 15	21.4; 9	16.1; 7	12.8; 5	12.1; 5	–	12.2

=== Voting preferences ===
The table below lists raw, unweighted voting preferences.

Polling firm/Commissioner	Fieldwork date	Sample size	PSC	CiU	PP	ERC	ICV–EUiA	C's	Question	X mark	Lead
2007 municipal election	27 May 2007	—N/a	14.8	12.6	7.7	4.4	4.6	1.9	—N/a	50.4	2.2
GESOP/El Periódico	9–11 May 2007	800	31.1	16.0	5.3	7.1	8.6	2.1	18.6	7.3	15.1
CIS	9–29 Apr 2007	991	22.8	16.6	4.6	8.0	10.1	1.5	23.6	10.1	6.2
GESOP/El Periódico	3 Mar 2007	?	29.1	17.9	5.4	7.6	7.5	1.3	18.1	8.6	11.2
2006 regional election (Note: Does not include non-resident citizens.)	1 Nov 2006	—N/a	14.7	17.8	8.0	7.3	7.2	2.7	—N/a	39.4	3.1
City Council	7–9 Mar 2006	800	24.7	14.7	3.4	9.9	5.5	–	25.2	10.5	10.0
City Council	14–16 Dec 2005	800	21.6	14.9	4.2	9.0	9.5	–	25.0	10.5	6.7
City Council	6–10 Oct 2005	800	27.7	12.6	5.0	9.1	8.3	–	24.1	10.1	15.1
City Council	6–8 Jun 2005	800	26.5	12.0	5.0	12.0	9.2	–	19.9	9.6	14.5
City Council	14–16 Mar 2005	800	28.7	11.4	5.7	8.6	7.1	–	21.0	11.2	17.3
City Council	1–3 Dec 2004	800	29.2	13.2	5.7	9.9	7.5	–	23.9	8.1	16.0
City Council	7–10 Sep 2004	800	29.2	12.4	5.3	10.2	8.8	–	22.7	7.9	16.8
City Council	16–21 Jun 2004	800	36.4	11.9	6.0	10.1	7.4	–	16.9	6.9	24.5
2004 EP election	13 Jun 2004	—N/a	17.5	7.0	9.6	4.5	4.0	–	—N/a	56.3	18.2
City Council	29–31 Mar 2004	800	30.5	14.9	5.6	9.6	9.2	–	23.1	5.5	15.6
2004 general election	14 Mar 2004	—N/a	29.6	15.5	14.1	11.4	5.4	–	—N/a	22.1	14.1
2003 regional election	16 Nov 2003	—N/a	20.4	18.6	10.1	10.4	5.4	–	—N/a	33.3	1.8
2003 municipal election	25 May 2003	—N/a	19.8	12.6	9.5	7.6	7.1	–	—N/a	40.8	7.2

=== Victory preferences ===
The table below lists opinion polling on the victory preferences for each party in the event of a municipal election taking place.

Polling firm/Commissioner	Fieldwork date	Sample size	PSC	CiU	PP	ERC	ICV–EUiA	C's	Other/ None	Question	Lead
Opina/El País	16 May 2007	600	28.4	16.3	12.6	8.3	7.0	–	–	18.7	12.1
CIS	9–29 Apr 2007	991	30.4	21.3	4.7	9.5	11.2	1.6	7.2	14.2	9.1

=== Victory likelihood ===
The table below lists opinion polling on the perceived likelihood of victory for each party in the event of a municipal election taking place.

Polling firm/Commissioner	Fieldwork date	Sample size	PSC	CiU	PP	ERC	ICV–EUiA	C's	Other/ None	Question	Lead
Opina/El País	16 May 2007	600	69.1	6.5	3.9	0.8	0.4	–	–	18.3	62.6
CIS	9–29 Apr 2007	991	57.4	15.2	1.3	1.2	0.3	0.1	0.8	23.6	42.2

=== Preferred Mayor ===
The table below lists opinion polling on leader preferences to become mayor of Barcelona.

All candidates

Polling firm/Commissioner	Fieldwork date	Sample size							Other/ None/ Not care	Question	Lead
Polling firm/Commissioner	Fieldwork date	Sample size	Hereu PSC	Trias CiU	F. Díaz PP	Portabella ERC	Mayol ICV–EUiA	García C's	Other/ None/ Not care	Question	Lead
Opina/El País	16 May 2007	600	26.8	15.1	11.6	7.6	8.0	1.4	29.5		11.7
Opina/La Vanguardia	7–16 May 2007	600	34.0	22.0	5.0	7.0	9.0	2.0	10.0	11.0	12.0
GESOP/El Periódico	9–11 May 2007	800	30.0	16.4	5.1	9.4	11.4	3.0	24.8		13.6
Opina/Cadena SER	7 May 2007	800	25.1	19.1	9.6	8.9	7.3	1.5	10.7	17.7	6.0
GAPS/CiU	May 2007	800	22.9	15.8	8.7	6.9	8.5	–	18.6	18.5	7.1
CIS	9–29 Apr 2007	991	23.9	15.7	3.3	7.1	10.6	–	4.5	34.8	8.2
GESOP/El Periódico	3 Mar 2007	?	25.9	18.6	5.1	8.1	12.8	–	29.6		13.6
GESOP/El Periódico	Sep 2006	?	17.3	25.0	5.5	11.5	18.3	–	22.6		6.7

Hereu vs. Trias

Polling firm/Commissioner	Fieldwork date	Sample size			Other/ None/ Not care	Question	Lead
Polling firm/Commissioner	Fieldwork date	Sample size	Hereu PSC	Trias CiU	Other/ None/ Not care	Question	Lead
GESOP/El Periódico	9–11 May 2007	800	50.1	32.5	17.4		17.6
GESOP/El Periódico	3 Mar 2007	?	44.9	32.6	22.5		12.3
GAPS/CiU	Mar 2007	?	46.5	37.0	16.5		9.5
GAPS/CiU	18–28 Sep 2006	800	46.5	34.9	18.6		11.6
GESOP/El Periódico	Sep 2006	?	39.0	37.0	24.0		2.0

Clos vs. Trias

Polling firm/Commissioner	Fieldwork date	Sample size			Other/ None/ Not care	Question	Lead
Polling firm/Commissioner	Fieldwork date	Sample size	Clos PSC	Trias CiU	Other/ None/ Not care	Question	Lead
GAPS/CiU	29 Nov 2005	800	39.4	42.0	18.6		2.6

=== Predicted Mayor ===
The table below lists opinion polling on the perceived likelihood for each leader to become mayor.

Polling firm/Commissioner	Fieldwork date	Sample size							Other/ None/ Not care	Question	Lead
Polling firm/Commissioner	Fieldwork date	Sample size	Hereu PSC	Trias CiU	F. Díaz PP	Portabella ERC	Mayol ICV–EUiA	García C's	Other/ None/ Not care	Question	Lead
Opina/El País	16 May 2007	600	68.6	5.8	4.1	0.5	0.6	0.4	20.0		62.8
Opina/La Vanguardia	7–16 May 2007	600	69.0	11.0	0.0	1.0	1.0	0.0	1.0	17.0	58.0
Opina/Cadena SER	7 May 2007	800	53.9	11.9	3.6	2.8	1.6	0.3	1.1	24.9	42.0
GAPS/CiU	May 2007	800	63.2	7.6	0.8	1.2	0.6	–	2.8	23.8	55.6

== Results ==
← Summary of the 27 May 2007 City Council of Barcelona election results →
Parties and alliances	Popular vote			Seats	
Parties and alliances	Votes	%	±pp	Total	+/−
Socialists' Party of Catalonia–Municipal Progress (PSC–PM)	182,216	29.91	−3.69	14	−1
Convergence and Union (CiU)	155,101	25.46	+4.05	12	+3
People's Party (PP)	95,083	15.61	−0.51	7	±0
Initiative–EUiA–Agreement for Municipal Progress (ICV–EUiA–EPM)	56,953	9.35	−2.72	4	−1
Republican Left of Catalonia–Municipal Agreement (ERC–AM)	53,707	8.81	−3.99	4	−1
Citizens–Party of the Citizenry (C's)	23,625	3.88	New	0	±0
The Greens–The Ecologist Alternative (EV–AE)	4,754	0.78	New	0	±0
Anti-Bullfighting Party Against Mistreatment of Animals (PACMA)	3,073	0.50	New	0	±0
Unsubmissive Seats–Alternative of Discontented Democrats (Ei–ADD)	2,290	0.38	+0.28	0	±0
Catalan Republican Party (RC)	1,214	0.20	New	0	±0
Communist Party of the Catalan People (PCPC)	972	0.16	New	0	±0
Republican Left–Left Republican Party (IR–PRE)	822	0.13	New	0	±0
For a Fairer World (PUM+J)	717	0.12	New	0	±0
Barcelona for Self-determination (BxA–FIC)	692	0.11	New	0	±0
Carmel/Blue Party (PAzul)	618	0.10	New	0	±0
Citizen Force (FC's)	591	0.10	New	0	±0
Family and Life Party (PFiV)	463	0.08	New	0	±0
Humanist Party (PH)	402	0.07	±0.00	0	±0
Platform for Catalonia (PxC)	351	0.06	+0.02	0	±0
Democratic and Social Centre (CDS)	270	0.04	−0.03	0	±0
Internationalist Struggle (LI (LIT–CI))	209	0.03	±0.00	0	±0
Internationalist Solidarity and Self-Management (SAIn)	183	0.03	New	0	±0
Blank ballots	25,002	4.10	+2.42		
Total	609,308			41	±0
Valid votes	609,308	99.48	−0.17		
Invalid votes	3,201	0.52	+0.17		
Votes cast / turnout	612,509	49.62	−9.62		
Abstentions	621,859	50.38	+9.62		
Registered voters	1,234,368				

Popular vote
PSC–PM	29.91%
CiU	25.46%
PP	15.61%
ICV–EUiA–EPM	9.35%
ERC–AM	8.81%
C's	3.88%
Others	2.89%
Blank ballots	4.10%

Seats
PSC–PM	34.15%
CiU	29.27%
PP	17.07%
ICV–EUiA–EPM	9.76%
ERC–AM	9.76%

== Aftermath ==
=== Government formation ===
Investiture
Ballot →	16 June 2007	
Required majority →	21 out of 41	
Jordi Hereu (PSC): • PSC (14); • ICV–EUiA (4)	18 / 41	check
Xavier Trias (CiU): • CiU (12)	12 / 41	X mark
Alberto Fernández Díaz (PP): • PP (7)	7 / 41	X mark
Jordi Portabella (ERC): • ERC (4)	4 / 41	X mark
Abstentions/Blank ballots	0 / 41	
Absentees	0 / 41	

== Bibliography ==
- Constitución Española (Constitution). Official State Gazette (in Spanish). 27 December 1978 [version as of 28 August 1992]. BOE-A-1978-31229.
- Ley 7/1985, de 2 de abril, Reguladora de las Bases del Régimen Local (Law 7/1985). Official State Gazette (in Spanish). 2 April 1985 [version as of 13 April 2007]. BOE-A-1985-5392.
- Ley Orgánica 5/1985, de 19 de junio, del Régimen Electoral General (Organic Law 5/1985). Official State Gazette (in Spanish). 19 June 1985 [version as of 20 April 2007]. BOE-A-1985-11672.
- Real Decreto 444/2007, de 2 de abril, por el que se convocan elecciones locales y a las Asambleas de Ceuta y Melilla, para el 27 de mayo de 2007 (Royal Decree 444/2007). Official State Gazette (in Spanish). 2 April 2007. BOE-A-2007-7018.
