= 2003 Barcelona municipal election =

Election in the Spanish municipality of Barcelona

- 25 May 2003

All 41 seats in the City Council of Barcelona 21 seats needed for a majority
- Opinion polls
- Registered: 1,281,534 ▼5.3%
- Turnout: 759,197 (59.2%) ▲7.7 pp
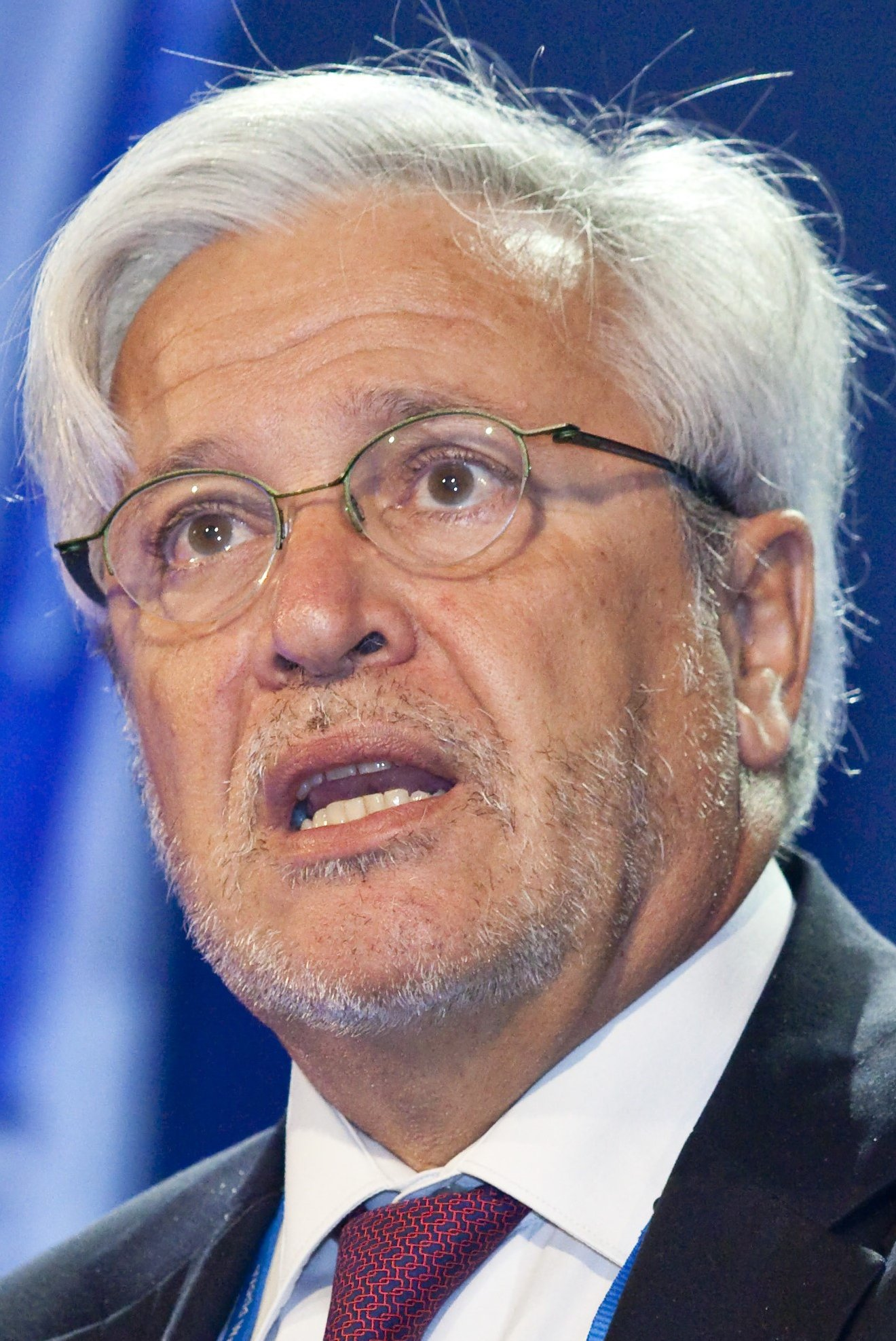

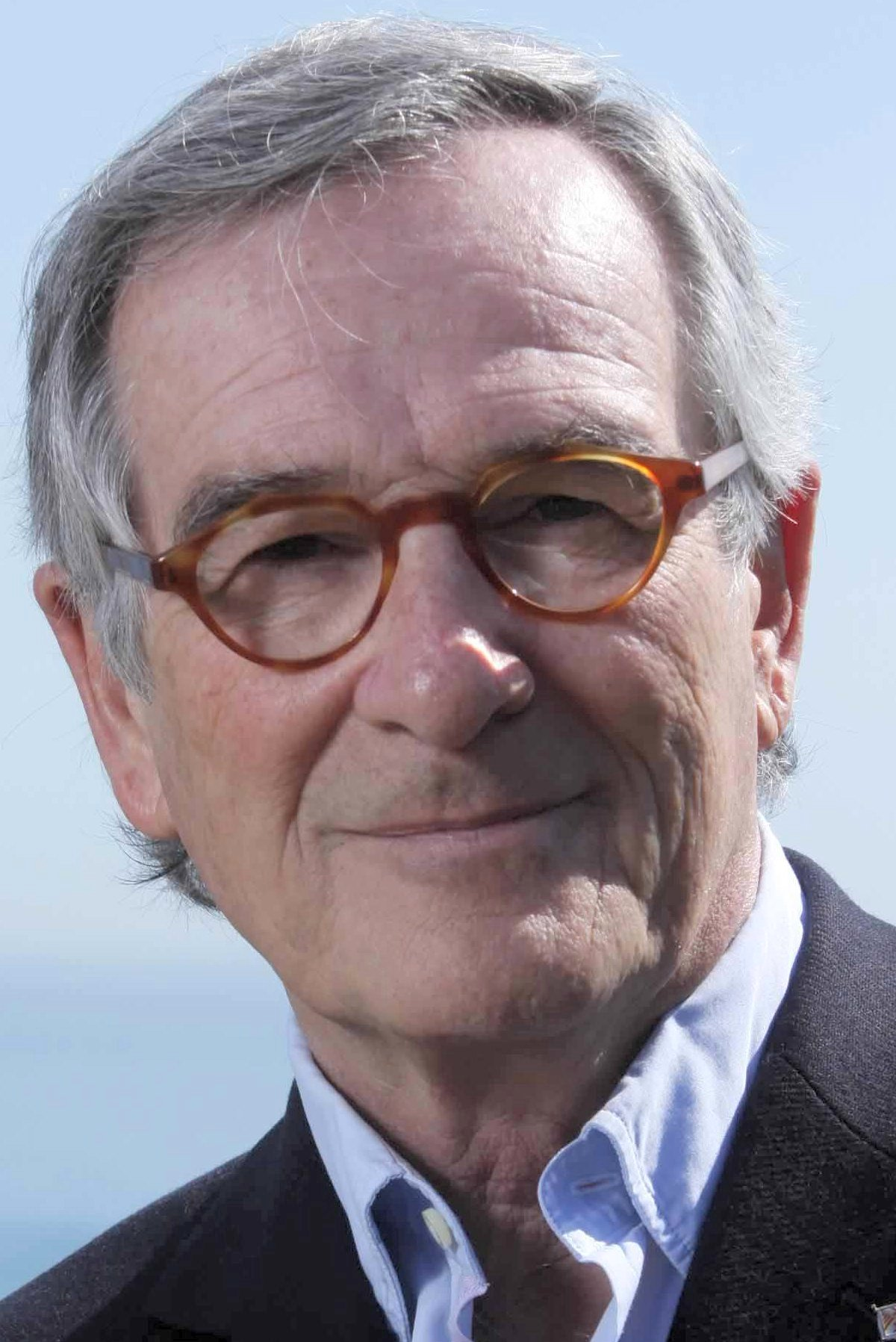

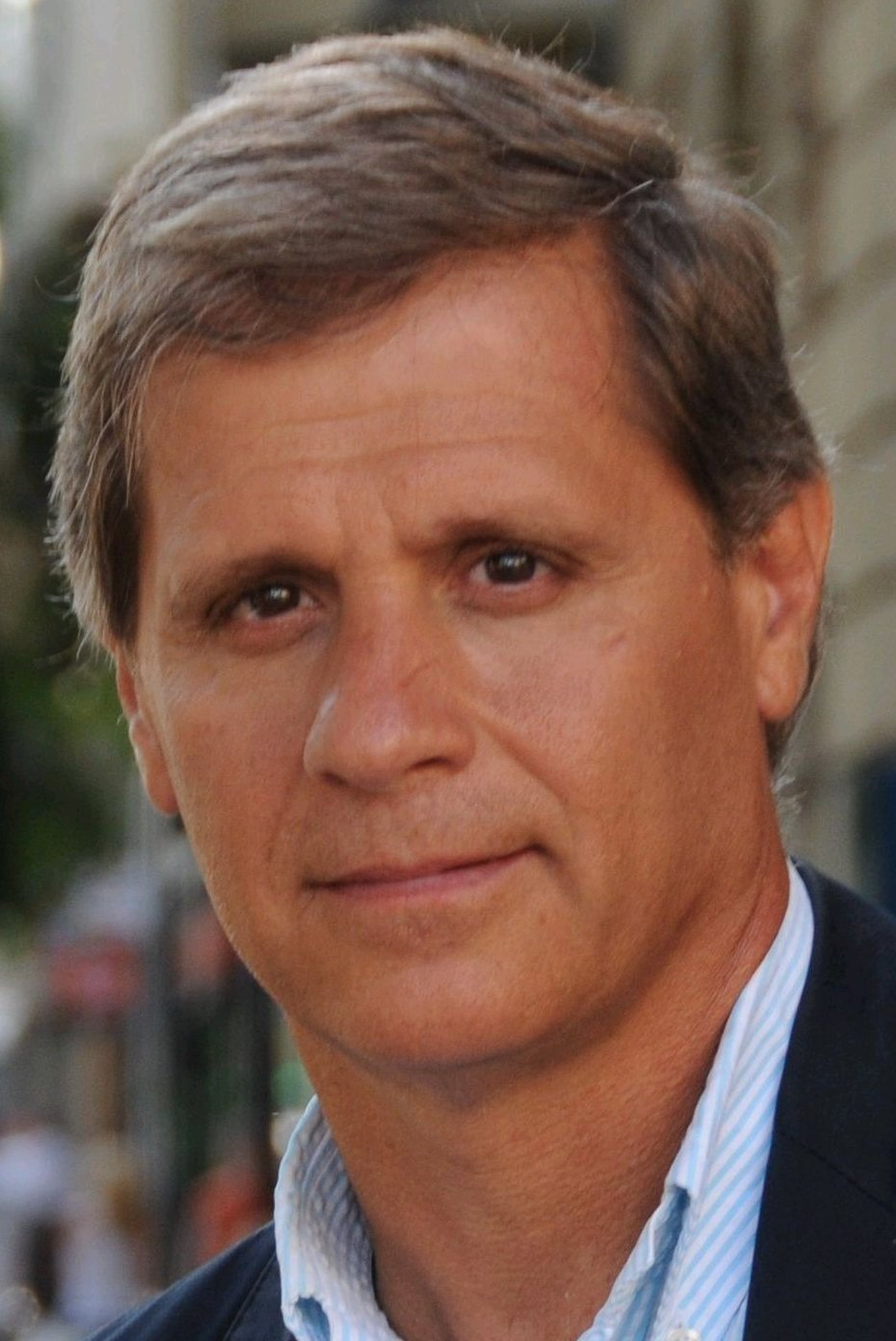

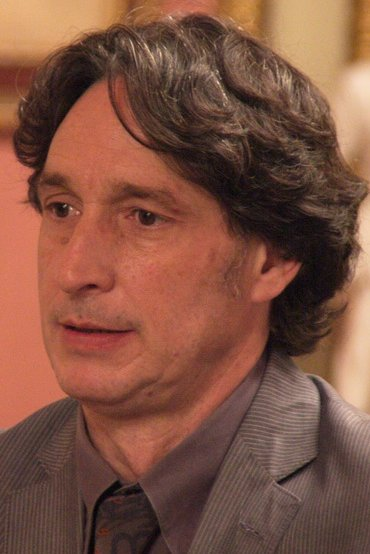

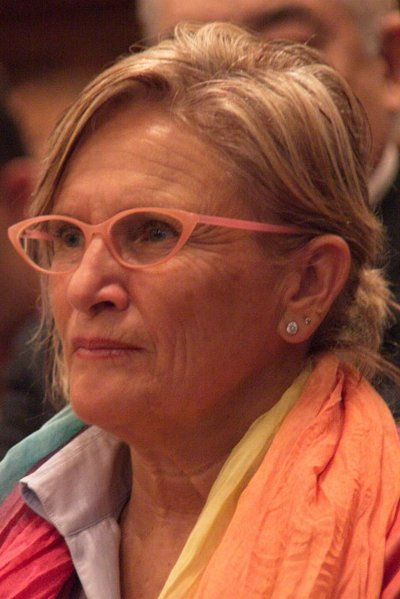
| | First party | Second party | Third party |
|---|---|---|---|
| Leader | Joan Clos | Xavier Trias | Alberto Fernández Díaz |
| Party | PSC–PM | CiU | PP |
| Leader since | 26 September 1997 | 17 May 2002 | 17 July 2002 |
| Last election | 20 seats, 45.2% | 10 seats, 21.7% | 6 seats, 14.9% |
| Seats won | 15 | 9 | 7 |
| Seat change | ▼5 | ▼1 | ▲1 |
| Popular vote | 254,223 | 162,010 | 121,991 |
| Percentage | 33.6% | 21.4% | 16.1% |
| Swing | ▼11.6 pp | ▼0.3 pp | ▲1.2 pp |
| | Fourth party | Fifth party |
| Leader | Jordi Portabella | Imma Mayol |
| Party | ERC–AM | ICV–EA–EPM |
| Leader since | 16 May 1998 | 1998 |
| Last election | 3 seats, 6.5% | 2 seats, 7.6% (Note: Results for IC–V–EPM (6.3%, 2 seats) and EUiA (1.3%, 0 seats) in the 1999 election.) |
| Seats won | 5 | 5 |
| Seat change | ▲2 | ▲3 |
| Popular vote | 96,868 | 91,286 |
| Percentage | 12.8% | 12.1% |
| Swing | ▲6.3 pp | ▲4.4 pp |
Mayor before election
Joan Clos
PSC
Mayor after election
Joan Clos
PSC

A municipal election was held in Barcelona on 25 May 2003 to elect the 7th City Council of the municipality. All 41 seats in the City Council were up for election. It was held concurrently with regional elections in thirteen autonomous communities and local elections all across Spain.

== Overview ==
Under the 1978 Constitution, the governance of municipalities in Spain—part of the country's local government system—was centered on the figure of city councils (Spanish: ayuntamientos), local corporations with independent legal personality composed of a mayor, a government council and an elected legislative assembly. The mayor was indirectly elected by the local assembly, requiring an absolute majority; otherwise, the candidate from the most-voted party automatically became mayor (ties were resolved by drawing lots). In the case of Barcelona, the top-tier administrative and governing body was the City Council of Barcelona.

=== Date ===
The term of local assemblies in Spain expired four years after the date of their previous election, with election day being fixed for the fourth Sunday of May every four years. The election decree was required to be issued no later than 54 days before the scheduled election date and published on the following day in the Official State Gazette (BOE). The previous local elections were held on 13 June 1999, setting the date for election day on the fourth Sunday of May four years later, which was 25 May 2003.

Local assemblies could not be dissolved before the expiration of their term, except in cases of mismanagement that seriously harmed the public interest and implied a breach of constitutional obligations, in which case the Council of Ministers could—optionally—decide to call a by-election.

Elections to the assemblies of local entities were officially called on 1 April 2003 with the publication of the corresponding decree in the BOE, setting election day for 25 May.

=== Electoral system ===
Voting for local assemblies was based on universal suffrage, comprising all Spanish nationals over 18 years of age, registered and residing in the municipality and with full political rights (provided that they had not been deprived of the right to vote by a final sentence, nor were legally incapacitated), as well as resident non-national European citizens, and those whose country of origin allowed reciprocal voting by virtue of a treaty.

Local councillors were elected using the D'Hondt method and closed-list proportional voting, with a five percent-threshold of valid votes (including blank ballots) in each municipality. Each municipality was a multi-member constituency, with a number of seats based on the following scale:

| Population | Councillors |
|---|---|
| <250 | 5 |
| 251–1,000 | 7 |
| 1,001–2,000 | 9 |
| 2,001–5,000 | 11 |
| 5,001–10,000 | 13 |
| 10,001–20,000 | 17 |
| 20,001–50,000 | 21 |
| 50,001–100,000 | 25 |
| >100,001 | +1 per each 100,000 inhabitants or fraction +1 if total is an even number |

The law did not provide for by-elections to fill vacant seats; instead, any vacancies arising after the proclamation of candidates and during the legislative term were filled by the next candidates on the party lists or, when required, by designated substitutes.

== Parties and candidates ==
The electoral law allowed for parties and federations registered in the interior ministry, alliances and groupings of electors to present lists of candidates. Parties and federations intending to form an alliance were required to inform the relevant electoral commission within 10 days of the election call, whereas groupings of electors needed to secure the signature of a determined amount of the electors registered in the municipality for which they sought election, disallowing electors from signing for more than one list. In the case of Barcelona, as its population was over 1,000,001, at least 8,000 signatures were required.

Below is a list of the main parties and alliances which contested the election:

| Candidacy | Parties and alliances | Leading candidate | Ideology | Previous result | | Gov. | Ref. |
| Candidacy | Parties and alliances | Leading candidate | Ideology | Vote % | Seats | Gov. | Ref. |
|---|---|---|---|---|---|---|---|
| PSC–PM | List: Socialists' Party of Catalonia (PSC–PSOE) | Joan Clos | Social democracy | 45.2% | 20 | Yes | |
| CiU | List: Convergence and Union (CiU) – Democratic Convergence of Catalonia (CDC) – Democratic Union of Catalonia (UDC) | Xavier Trias | Catalan nationalism Centrism | 21.7% | 10 | No | |
| PP | List: People's Party (PP) | Alberto Fernández Díaz | Conservatism; Christian democracy | 14.9% | 6 | No | |
| ERC–AM | List: Republican Left of Catalonia (ERC) | Jordi Portabella | Catalan independence Left-wing nationalism Social democracy | 6.5% | 3 | No | |
| ICV– EA–EPM | List: Initiative for Catalonia Greens (ICV); United and Alternative Left (EUiA) – Party of the Communists of Catalonia (PCC) – Living Unified Socialist Party of Catalonia (PSUC viu) – Revolutionary Workers' Party (POR) – Workers' Revolutionary Party–Revolutionary Left (PRT–IR) | Imma Mayol | Regionalism; Eco-socialism; Green politics | 7.6% | 2 | Yes | |

== Opinion polls ==
The tables below list opinion polling results in reverse chronological order, showing the most recent first and using the dates when the survey fieldwork was done, as opposed to the date of publication. Where the fieldwork dates are unknown, the date of publication is given instead. The highest percentage figure in each polling survey is displayed with its background shaded in the leading party's colour. If a tie ensues, this is applied to the figures with the highest percentages. The "Lead" column on the right shows the percentage-point difference between the parties with the highest percentages in a poll.

=== Voting intention estimates ===
The table below lists weighted voting intention estimates. Refusals are generally excluded from the party vote percentages, while question wording and the treatment of "don't know" responses and those not intending to vote may vary between polling organisations. When available, seat projections determined by the polling organisations are displayed below (or in place of) the percentages in a smaller font; 21 seats were required for an absolute majority in the City Council of Barcelona.

Color key:

Exit poll

| Polling firm/Commissioner | Fieldwork date | Sample size | Turnout | PSC | CiU | PP | ERC | ICV | EUiA | Lead |
|---|---|---|---|---|---|---|---|---|---|---|
| 2003 municipal election | 25 May 2003 | —N/a | 59.2 | 33.6; 15 | 21.4; 9 | 16.1; 7 | 12.8; 5 | 12.1; 5 | (Note: Within ICV.) | 12.2 |
| Sigma Dos/Antena 3 | 25 May 2003 | ? | ? | ? 17/18 | ? 9 | ? 5/6 | ? 4/5 | ? 4/5 | | ? |
| Ipsos–Eco/RTVE | 25 May 2003 | ? | ? | ? 15/16 | ? 8/9 | ? 5/6 | – | – | | ? |
| Opina/El País | 19 May 2003 | ? | ? | 40.5; 18 | 25.0; 11 | 12.5; 5 | 9.0; 4 | 7.5; 3 | | 15.5 |
| Vox Pública/El Periódico | 12–13 May 2003 | 803 | ? | 42.5– 43.5; 18/19 | 19.5– 20.5; 8/9 | 12.5– 13.5; 5/6 | 10.0– 11.0; 4/5 | 10.5– 11.5; 4/5 | | 23.0 |
| Noxa/La Vanguardia | 1 May 2003 | ? | ? | 42.2; 18/19 | 22.1; 9/10 | 12.3; 5 | 11.2; 5 | 8.0; 3 | | 20.1 |
| CIS | 22 Mar–28 Apr 2003 | 715 | ? | 43.8; 19 | 18.5; 8 | 11.5; 5 | 12.0; 5 | 9.4; 4 | | 25.3 |
| Noxa/La Vanguardia | 20 Jan 2003 | ? | ? | 45.0; 19/20 | 26.1; 11/12 | 10.6; 4 | 10.4; 4 | 5.8; 2 | | 18.9 |
| 2000 general election | 12 Mar 2000 | —N/a | 65.6 | 37.6 (17) | 34.6 (16) | 12.8 (5) | 8.2 (3) | 3.2 (0) | 1.3 (0) | 3.0 |
| 1999 regional election | 17 Oct 1999 | —N/a | 62.3 | 45.2; 20 | 21.7; 10 | 14.9; 6 | 6.5; 3 | 6.3; 2 | 1.3; 0 | 23.5 |
| 1999 municipal election | 13 Jun 1999 | —N/a | 51.5 | 45.2; 20 | 21.7; 10 | 14.9; 6 | 6.5; 3 | 6.3; 2 | 1.3; 0 | 23.5 |

=== Voting preferences ===
The table below lists raw, unweighted voting preferences.

| Polling firm/Commissioner | Fieldwork date | Sample size | PSC | CiU | PP | ERC | ICV | EUiA | Question | X mark | Lead |
|---|---|---|---|---|---|---|---|---|---|---|---|
| 2003 municipal election | 25 May 2003 | —N/a | 19.8 | 12.6 | 9.5 | 7.6 | 7.1 | | —N/a | 40.8 | 7.2 |
| Vox Pública/El Periódico | 12–13 May 2003 | 803 | 34.9 | 13.7 | 7.0 | 7.8 | 7.6 | | 22.2 | 3.7 | 21.2 |
| CIS | 22 Mar–28 Apr 2003 | 715 | 28.8 | 12.3 | 4.9 | 8.7 | 5.7 | | 27.4 | 8.3 | 16.5 |
| City Council | Sep 2002 | 800 | 23.5 | 12.6 | 6.0 | 6.4 | 2.9 | | 34.0 | 11.5 | 10.9 |
| City Council | Jun 2002 | 800 | 23.1 | 12.1 | 5.9 | 5.3 | 4.5 | – | 33.3 | 10.9 | 11.0 |
| City Council | Mar 2002 | 800 | 26.3 | 12.0 | 7.1 | 3.9 | 4.6 | – | 30.1 | 13.4 | 14.3 |
| City Council | Dec 2001 | 800 | 25.8 | 13.0 | 8.3 | 6.0 | 3.6 | – | 26.6 | 12.0 | 12.8 |
| City Council | Sep 2001 | 800 | 28.9 | 10.4 | 6.1 | 4.8 | 3.4 | – | 28.0 | 13.6 | 18.5 |
| City Council | Jun 2001 | 800 | 26.3 | 11.9 | 7.0 | 4.9 | 2.5 | – | 32.6 | 10.3 | 14.4 |
| City Council | Mar 2001 | 800 | 30.9 | 9.5 | 6.0 | 3.0 | 2.9 | – | 33.1 | 10.9 | 21.4 |
| City Council | Nov 2000 | 800 | 29.6 | 11.5 | 4.5 | 3.8 | 2.4 | – | 32.4 | 12.4 | 18.1 |
| City Council | Sep 2000 | 800 | 29.5 | 9.6 | 5.0 | 3.5 | 2.5 | – | 37.5 | 9.9 | 19.9 |
| City Council | Jun 2000 | 800 | 30.6 | 11.8 | 7.4 | 4.0 | 3.1 | – | 28.9 | 11.6 | 18.8 |
| 2000 general election (Note: Does not include non-resident citizens.) | 12 Mar 2000 | —N/a | 20.4 | 17.7 | 17.2 | 3.7 | 2.8 | 1.4 | —N/a | 34.4 | 2.7 |
| City Council | Mar 2000 | 800 | 28.0 | 13.5 | 4.6 | 3.5 | 1.9 | – | 33.7 | 11.6 | 14.5 |
| 1999 regional election | 17 Oct 1999 | —N/a | 23.4 | 21.5 | 7.9 | 5.1 | 2.0 | 0.8 | —N/a | 37.7 | 1.9 |
| 1999 municipal election | 13 Jun 1999 | —N/a | 23.2 | 11.1 | 7.6 | 3.3 | 3.3 | 0.7 | —N/a | 48.5 | 12.1 |

=== Victory preferences ===
The table below lists opinion polling on the victory preferences for each party in the event of a municipal election taking place.

| Polling firm/Commissioner | Fieldwork date | Sample size | PSC | CiU | PP | ERC | ICV | Other/ None | Question | Lead |
|---|---|---|---|---|---|---|---|---|---|---|
| CIS | 22 Mar–28 Apr 2003 | 715 | 38.9 | 17.8 | 5.2 | 9.1 | 6.3 | 2.9 | 19.9 | 16.5 |

=== Victory likelihood ===
The table below lists opinion polling on the perceived likelihood of victory for each party in the event of a municipal election taking place.

| Polling firm/Commissioner | Fieldwork date | Sample size | PSC | CiU | PP | ERC | ICV | Other/ None | Question | Lead |
|---|---|---|---|---|---|---|---|---|---|---|
| Noxa/La Vanguardia | 1 May 2003 | ? | 58.0 | 15.0 | – | – | – | 27.0 | | 43.0 |
| CIS | 22 Mar–28 Apr 2003 | 715 | 70.5 | 9.5 | 1.0 | 0.3 | 0.1 | 0.1 | 18.4 | 61.0 |
| Noxa/La Vanguardia | 20 Jan 2003 | ? | 51.0 | 26.0 | – | – | – | 23.0 | | 25.0 |

=== Preferred Mayor ===
The table below lists opinion polling on leader preferences to become mayor of Barcelona.

| Polling firm/Commissioner | Fieldwork date | Sample size | | | | | | Other/ None/ Not care | Question | Lead |
| Polling firm/Commissioner | Fieldwork date | Sample size | Clos PSC | Trias CiU | F. Díaz PP | Portabella ERC | Mayol ICV–EUiA | Other/ None/ Not care | Question | Lead |
|---|---|---|---|---|---|---|---|---|---|---|
| Vox Pública/El Periódico | 12–13 May 2003 | 803 | 39.5 | 13.3 | 4.1 | 6.2 | 6.7 | 10.1 | 20.0 | 26.2 |

=== Predicted Mayor ===
The table below lists opinion polling on the perceived likelihood for each leader to become mayor.

| Polling firm/Commissioner | Fieldwork date | Sample size | | | | | | Other/ None/ Not care | Question | Lead |
| Polling firm/Commissioner | Fieldwork date | Sample size | Clos PSC | Trias CiU | F. Díaz PP | Portabella ERC | Mayol ICV–EUiA | Other/ None/ Not care | Question | Lead |
|---|---|---|---|---|---|---|---|---|---|---|
| Vox Pública/El Periódico | 12–13 May 2003 | 803 | 70.4 | 3.2 | 0.5 | 0.1 | 0.5 | 0.3 | 24.9 | 67.2 |

== Results ==
← Summary of the 25 May 2003 City Council of Barcelona election results →
| Parties and alliances | Popular vote | | | Seats | |
| Parties and alliances | Votes | % | ±pp | Total | +/− |
|---|---|---|---|---|---|
| Socialists' Party of Catalonia–Municipal Progress (PSC–PM) | 254,223 | 33.60 | −11.59 | 15 | −5 |
| Convergence and Union (CiU) | 162,010 | 21.41 | −0.28 | 9 | −1 |
| People's Party (PP) | 121,991 | 16.12 | +1.25 | 7 | +1 |
| Republican Left of Catalonia–Municipal Agreement (ERC–AM) | 96,868 | 12.80 | +6.28 | 5 | +2 |
| Initiative–Alternative Left–Agreement for Municipal Progress (ICV–EA–EPM)^{1} | 91,286 | 12.07 | +4.44 | 5 | +3 |
| The Greens–Eco-pacifists of Catalonia (EV–Eco) | 5,449 | 0.72 | New | 0 | ±0 |
| The Greens and More (ViM) | 3,955 | 0.52 | New | 0 | ±0 |
| The Greens–Green Alternative (EV–AV) | 3,209 | 0.42 | New | 0 | ±0 |
| Another Democracy is Possible (ODeP) | 1,143 | 0.15 | New | 0 | ±0 |
| Unsubmissive Seats (Ei) | 731 | 0.10 | New | 0 | ±0 |
| The Phalanx (FE) | 604 | 0.08 | −0.01 | 0 | ±0 |
| Catalan State (EC) | 582 | 0.08 | ±0.00 | 0 | ±0 |
| Democratic and Social Centre (CDS) | 539 | 0.07 | −0.04 | 0 | ±0 |
| Humanist Party of Catalonia (PHC) | 503 | 0.07 | ±0.00 | 0 | ±0 |
| Platform for Catalonia (PxC) | 333 | 0.04 | New | 0 | ±0 |
| Internationalist Struggle (LI (LIT–CI)) | 264 | 0.03 | New | 0 | ±0 |
| European Nation State (N) | 198 | 0.03 | ±0.00 | 0 | ±0 |
| Blank ballots | 12,679 | 1.68 | −0.21 | | |
| Total | 756,567 | | | 41 | ±0 |
| Valid votes | 756,567 | 99.65 | +0.09 | | |
| Invalid votes | 2,630 | 0.35 | −0.09 | | |
| Votes cast / turnout | 759,197 | 59.24 | +7.71 | | |
| Abstentions | 522,337 | 40.76 | −7.71 | | |
| Registered voters | 1,281,534 | | | | |
Sources
Footnotes: ^{1} Initiative–Alternative Left–Agreement for Municipal Progress results are compared to the combined totals of Initiative for Catalonia–Greens–Agreement for Municipal Progress and United and Alternative Left in the 1999 election.

Popular vote
| PSC–PM | 33.60% |
| CiU | 21.41% |
| PP | 16.12% |
| ERC–AM | 12.80% |
| ICV–EA–EPM | 12.07% |
| Others | 2.31% |
| Blank ballots | 1.68% |

Seats
| PSC–PM | 36.59% |
| CiU | 21.95% |
| PP | 17.07% |
| ERC–AM | 12.20% |
| ICV–EA–EPM | 12.20% |

== Aftermath ==
=== Government formation ===
Investiture
| Ballot → | 14 June 2003 | |
| Required majority → | 21 out of 41 | |
| Joan Clos (PSC): • PSC (15); • ERC (5); • ICV–EUiA (5) | 25 / 41 | check |
| Xavier Trias (CiU): • CiU (9) | 9 / 41 | X mark |
| Alberto Fernández Díaz (PP): • PP (7) | 7 / 41 | X mark |
| Abstentions/Blank ballots | 0 / 41 | |
| Absentees | 0 / 41 | |

=== 2006 investiture ===
Investiture
| Ballot → | 8 September 2006 | |
| Required majority → | 21 out of 41 | |
| Jordi Hereu (PSC): • PSC (15); • ERC (5); • ICV–EUiA (5) | 25 / 41 | check |
| Xavier Trias (CiU): • CiU (9) | 9 / 41 | X mark |
| Alberto Fernández Díaz (PP): • PP (7) | 7 / 41 | X mark |
| Abstentions/Blank ballots | 0 / 41 | |
| Absentees | 0 / 41 | |

== Bibliography ==
- Decreto 1166/1960, de 23 de mayo, por el que se establece un régimen especial para el Municipio de Barcelona, conforme a lo autorizado por el artículo 94 de la vigente Ley de Régimen Local (PDF) (Decree 1166/1960). Official State Gazette (in Spanish). 23 May 1960. BOE-A-1960-9155.
- Constitución Española (Constitution). Official State Gazette (in Spanish). 27 December 1978 [version as of 28 August 1992]. BOE-A-1978-31229.
- Ley 7/1985, de 2 de abril, Reguladora de las Bases del Régimen Local (Law 7/1985). Official State Gazette (in Spanish). 2 April 1985 [version as of 11 March 2003]. BOE-A-1985-5392.
- Ley Orgánica 5/1985, de 19 de junio, del Régimen Electoral General (Organic Law 5/1985). Official State Gazette (in Spanish). 19 June 1985 [version as of 11 March 2003]. BOE-A-1985-11672.
- Real Decreto 374/2003, de 31 de marzo, por el que se convocan elecciones locales y a las Asambleas de Ceuta y Melilla (Royal Decree 374/2003). Official State Gazette (in Spanish). 31 March 2003. BOE-A-2003-6489.
