= 2011 Barcelona municipal election =

Election in the Spanish municipality of Barcelona

- 22 May 2011

All 41 seats in the City Council of Barcelona 21 seats needed for a majority
- Opinion polls
- Registered: 1,163,594 ▼5.7%
- Turnout: 616,537 (53.0%) ▲3.4 pp
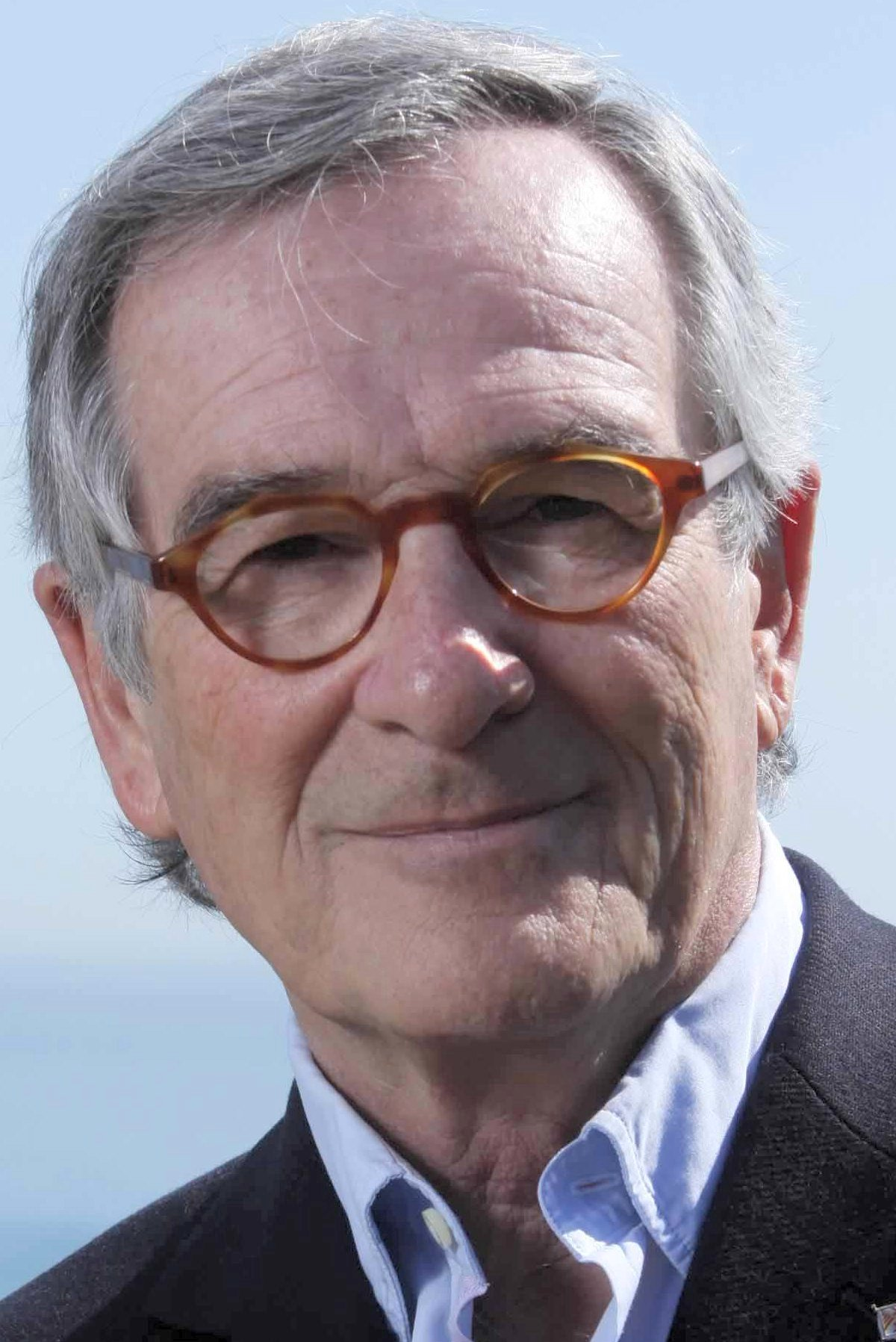

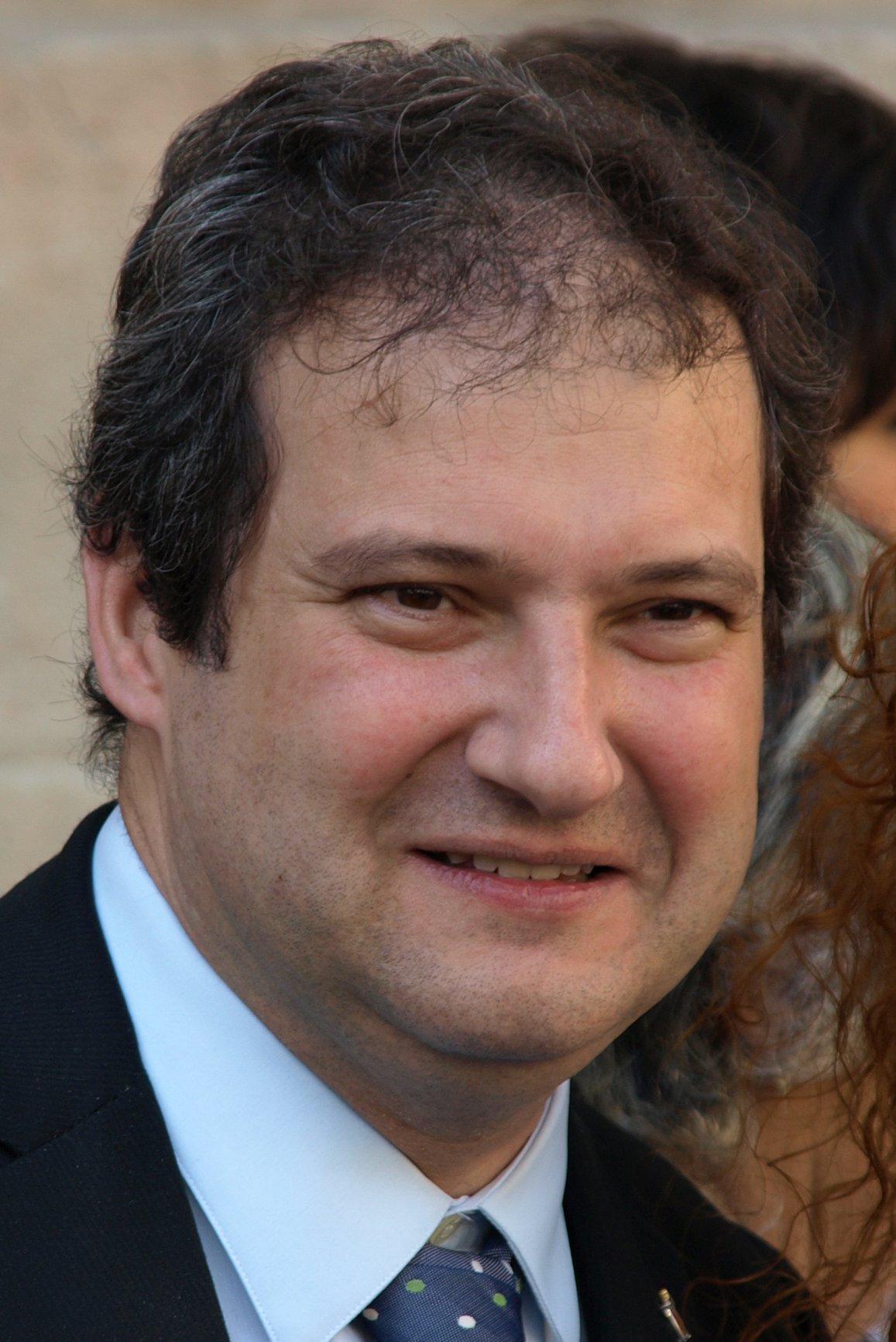

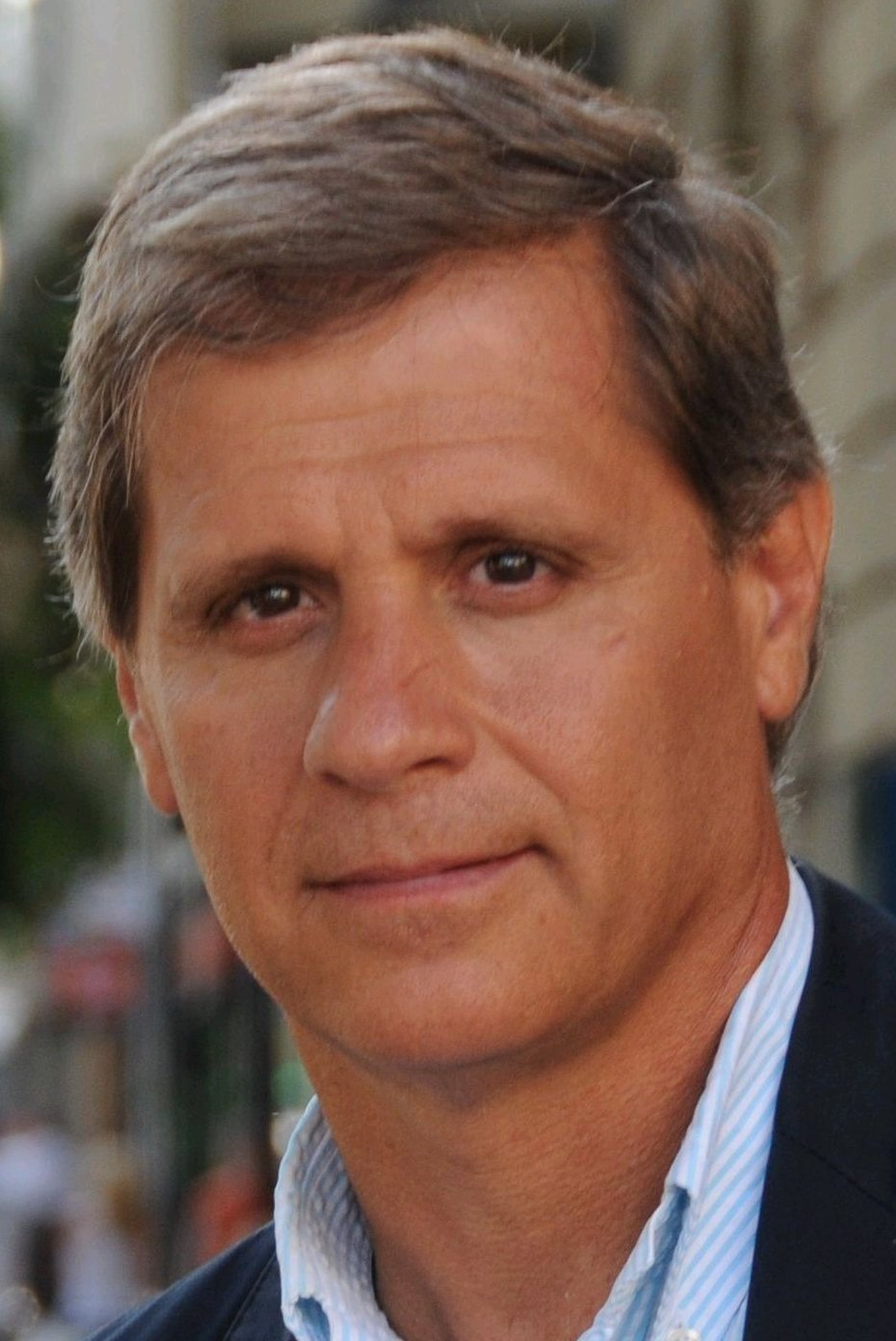

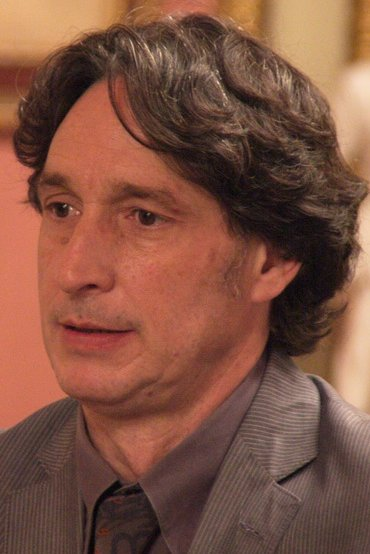
	First party	Second party	Third party
Leader	Xavier Trias	Jordi Hereu	Alberto Fernández Díaz
Party	CiU	PSC–PM	PP
Leader since	17 May 2002	8 September 2006	17 July 2002
Last election	12 seats, 25.5%	14 seats, 29.9%	7 seats, 15.6%
Seats won	14	11	9
Seat change	▲2	▼3	▲2
Popular vote	174,122	134,193	104,475
Percentage	28.7%	22.1%	17.2%
Swing	▲3.2 pp	▼7.8 pp	▲1.6 pp
	Fourth party	Fifth party
Leader	Ricard Gomà	Jordi Portabella
Party	ICV–EUiA–E	UpB–ERC–RI.cat–DCat
Leader since	4 July 2010	16 May 1998
Last election	4 seats, 9.3%	4 seats, 8.8%
Seats won	5	2
Seat change	▲1	▼2
Popular vote	62,979	33,900
Percentage	10.4%	5.6%
Swing	▲1.1 pp	▼3.2 pp
Mayor before election
Jordi Hereu
PSC
Mayor after election
Xavier Trias
CiU

A municipal election was held in Barcelona on 22 May 2011 to elect the 9th City Council of the municipality. All 41 seats in the City Council were up for election. It was held concurrently with regional elections in thirteen autonomous communities and local elections all across Spain.

== Overview ==
Under the 1978 Constitution, the governance of municipalities in Spain—part of the country's local government system—was centered on the figure of city councils (Spanish: ayuntamientos), local corporations with independent legal personality composed of a mayor, a government council and an elected legislative assembly. The mayor was indirectly elected by the local assembly, requiring an absolute majority; otherwise, the candidate from the most-voted party automatically became mayor (ties were resolved by drawing lots). In the case of Barcelona, the top-tier administrative and governing body was the City Council of Barcelona.

=== Date ===
The term of local assemblies in Spain expired four years after the date of their previous election, with election day being fixed for the fourth Sunday of May every four years. The election decree was required to be issued no later than 54 days before the scheduled election date and published on the following day in the Official State Gazette (BOE). The previous local elections were held on 27 May 2007, setting the date for election day on the fourth Sunday of May four years later, which was 22 May 2011.

Local assemblies could not be dissolved before the expiration of their term, except in cases of mismanagement that seriously harmed the public interest and implied a breach of constitutional obligations, in which case the Council of Ministers could—optionally—decide to call a by-election.

Elections to the assemblies of local entities were officially called on 29 March 2011 with the publication of the corresponding decree in the BOE, setting election day for 22 May.

=== Electoral system ===
Voting for local assemblies was based on universal suffrage, comprising all Spanish nationals over 18 years of age, registered and residing in the municipality and with full political rights (provided that they had not been deprived of the right to vote by a final sentence, nor were legally incapacitated), as well as resident non-national European citizens, and those whose country of origin allowed reciprocal voting by virtue of a treaty.

Local councillors were elected using the D'Hondt method and closed-list proportional voting, with a five percent-threshold of valid votes (including blank ballots) in each municipality. Each municipality was a multi-member constituency, with a number of seats based on the following scale (amended for smaller municipalities in 2011):

Population	Councillors
<100	3
101–250	5
251–1,000	7
1,001–2,000	9
2,001–5,000	11
5,001–10,000	13
10,001–20,000	17
20,001–50,000	21
50,001–100,000	25
>100,001	+1 per each 100,000 inhabitants or fraction +1 if total is an even number

The law did not provide for by-elections to fill vacant seats; instead, any vacancies arising after the proclamation of candidates and during the legislative term were filled by the next candidates on the party lists or, when required, by designated substitutes.

== Parties and candidates ==
The electoral law allowed for parties and federations registered in the interior ministry, alliances and groupings of electors to present lists of candidates. Parties and federations intending to form an alliance were required to inform the relevant electoral commission within 10 days of the election call, whereas groupings of electors needed to secure the signature of a determined amount of the electors registered in the municipality for which they sought election, disallowing electors from signing for more than one list. In the case of Barcelona, as its population was over 1,000,001, at least 8,000 signatures were required. Additionally, a balanced composition of men and women was required in the electoral lists, so that candidates of either sex made up at least 40 percent of the total composition.

Below is a list of the main parties and alliances which contested the election:

Candidacy	Parties and alliances	Leading candidate	Ideology	Previous result		Gov.	Ref.
Candidacy	Parties and alliances	Leading candidate	Ideology	Vote %	Seats	Gov.	Ref.
PSC–PM	List: Socialists' Party of Catalonia (PSC–PSOE)	Jordi Hereu	Social democracy	29.9%	14	Yes	
CiU	List: Convergence and Union (CiU) – Democratic Convergence of Catalonia (CDC) – Democratic Union of Catalonia (UDC)	Xavier Trias	Catalan nationalism Centrism	25.5%	12	No	
PP	List: People's Party (PP)	Alberto Fernández Díaz	Conservatism; Christian democracy	15.6%	7	No	
ICV–EUiA–E	List: Initiative for Catalonia Greens (ICV); United and Alternative Left (EUiA) – Party of the Communists of Catalonia (PCC) – Living Unified Socialist Party of Catalonia (PSUC viu) – Revolutionary Workers' Party (POR)	Ricard Gomà	Regionalism; Eco-socialism; Green politics	9.3%	4	Yes	
UpB–ERC– RI.cat–DCat	List: Republican Left of Catalonia (ERC); Independence Rally (RI.cat); Catalan Democracy (DCat)	Jordi Portabella	Catalan independence Left-wing nationalism Social democracy	8.8%	4	No	

== Opinion polls ==
The tables below list opinion polling results in reverse chronological order, showing the most recent first and using the dates when the survey fieldwork was done, as opposed to the date of publication. Where the fieldwork dates are unknown, the date of publication is given instead. The highest percentage figure in each polling survey is displayed with its background shaded in the leading party's colour. If a tie ensues, this is applied to the figures with the highest percentages. The "Lead" column on the right shows the percentage-point difference between the parties with the highest percentages in a poll.

=== Voting intention estimates ===
The table below lists weighted voting intention estimates. Refusals are generally excluded from the party vote percentages, while question wording and the treatment of "don't know" responses and those not intending to vote may vary between polling organisations. When available, seat projections determined by the polling organisations are displayed below (or in place of) the percentages in a smaller font; 21 seats were required for an absolute majority in the City Council of Barcelona.

Color key:

Exit poll

Polling firm/Commissioner	Fieldwork date	Sample size	Turnout	PSC	CiU	PP	ICV–EUiA	ERC	C's	Lead
2011 municipal election	22 May 2011	—N/a	53.0	22.1; 11	28.7; 14	17.2; 9	10.4; 5	5.6; 2	1.9; 0	6.6
Ipsos–Eco/FORTA	22 May 2011	?	?	? 10/12	? 14/16	? 7/8	? 4/5	? 2/3	–	?
Ikerfel/Vocento	14 May 2011	900	?	27.2; 12	30.9; 14	14.9; 6/7	? 4	? 4/5	–	3.7
GESOP/El Periódico	12–13 May 2011	800	?	23.5; 12	29.0; 14	15.9; 7/8	9.4; 4/5	6.0; 2/3	2.7; 0	5.5
Sigma Dos/El Mundo	10–12 May 2011	400	?	26.2; 12	32.1; 14/15	17.1; 7/8	8.6; 4	7.8; 3	–	5.9
Metroscopia/El País	10–11 May 2011	1,000	55.0	24.7; 12	29.4; 15	15.4; 7	9.4; 4	6.7; 3	–	4.7
GAD/COPE	9 May 2011	?	?	24.5; 12	30.2; 14	18.1; 8	8.5; 4	7.9; 3	–	5.7
TNS Demoscopia/Antena 3	2–3 May 2011	750	?	24.9; 11/12	32.3; 15/16	16.1; 7/8	10.2; 4	6.9; 3/4	3.7; 0	7.4
GAPS/CiU	26–29 Apr 2011	800	?	23.0– 24.6; 11/12	33.4– 34.4; 16/17	13.9– 14.9; 6/7	8.7– 9.7; 4	6.0– 7.0; 2/3	–	9.8– 10.4
Noxa/La Vanguardia	25–27 Apr 2011	600	?	24.9; 11/12	31.6; 14/15	18.3; 8	9.6; 4	6.6; 3	2.2; 0	6.7
Sigma Dos/El Mundo	15–18 Apr 2011	400	?	26.2; 12	32.5; 15/16	19.3; 8/9	6.7; 3	5.4; 2	–	6.3
CIS	17 Mar–17 Apr 2011	967	?	25.2; 12	33.1; 16	12.4; 5	8.9; 4	8.5; 4	4.3; 0	7.9
PSOE	1–15 Mar 2011	800	?	? 13	? 16	? 6	? 3	? 3	–	?
GESOP/El Periódico	21–22 Feb 2011	800	?	24.6; 11/12	35.3; 16/17	14.3; 6/7	8.0; 3/4	7.5; 3	–	10.7
GESOP/El Periódico	31 Jan–1 Feb 2011	400	? (Note: Montserrat Tura as PSC candidate hypothesis.)	27.0; 13	32.0; 15	15.5; 7	6.5; 3	7.5; 3	–	5.0
GESOP/El Periódico	31 Jan–1 Feb 2011	400	? (Note: Jordi Hereu as PSC candidate hypothesis.)	18.5; 9	38.0; 18/19	15.5; 7	8.0; 3/4	8.0; 3/4	–	19.5
Feedback/La Vanguardia	12–14 Jan 2011	600	60.0	33.4; 15	34.3; 16	13.4; 6	6.4; 2	5.1; 2	–	0.9
Feedback/La Vanguardia	12–14 Jan 2011	600	60.0	21.3; 10	42.5; 19	13.7; 6	7.0; 3	8.1; 3	–	21.2
Ara	8 Dec 2010	?	?	? 9/11	? 17/19	? 6	? 4/5	? 2/3	–	?
2010 regional election	28 Nov 2010	—N/a	62.3	17.8 (9)	36.3 (18)	14.2 (7)	9.3 (4)	6.5 (3)	4.1 (0)	18.5
Sigma Dos/El Mundo	15–18 Nov 2010	400	?	25.5; 11/12	31.5; 14/15	17.1; 8	10.1; 4	6.7; 3	3.5; 0	6.0
GAPS/CiU	25–31 May 2010	817	?	20.0– 21.0; 10/11	36.7– 37.7; 17/19	13.2– 14.2; 6/7	6.8– 7.8; 2/3	6.0– 7.0; 3	–	16.7
Noxa/La Vanguardia	24–27 May 2010	1,000	?	24.7; 11	39.6; 17	14.9; 6	9.5; 4	6.7; 3	1.9; 0	14.9
GAPS/CiU	28 Nov–10 Dec 2009	805	?	24.0– 25.0; 11/12	32.7– 33.7; 15/16	13.3– 14.3; 6/7	9.2– 10.2; 4/5	7.9– 8.9; 3/4	1.8; 0	8.7
Noxa/La Vanguardia	18–23 Nov 2009	1,000	?	28.8; 13	30.1; 13	17.4; 7/8	11.0; 4/5	7.5; 3	3.9; 0	1.3
2009 EP election	7 Jun 2009	—N/a	40.5	32.7 (15)	21.7 (10)	20.7 (9)	8.0 (3)	8.4 (4)	0.4 (0)	11.0
GAPS/CiU	10–23 Mar 2009	810	?	26.9; 13	32.8; 15	14.0; 6	8.6; 4	7.6; 3	2.0; 0	5.9
GESOP/El Periódico	1–3 Dec 2008	800	?	27.7; 13/14	27.9; 13/14	15.1; 7	8.0; 3/4	8.0; 3/4	–	0.2
GAPS/CiU	21–30 May 2008	804	?	26.5– 27.5; 12/13	28.2– 29.2; 13/14	12.9– 13.9; 5/7	8.7– 9.7; 4/5	10.9– 11.9; 4/6	1.5– 2.5; 0	1.7
2008 general election	9 Mar 2008	—N/a	72.2	42.8 (18)	20.7 (9)	18.3 (8)	6.4 (3)	7.0 (3)	0.9 (0)	22.1
2007 municipal election	27 May 2007	—N/a	49.6	29.9; 14	25.5; 12	15.6; 7	9.3; 4	8.8; 4	3.9; 0	4.4

=== Voting preferences ===
The table below lists raw, unweighted voting preferences.

Polling firm/Commissioner	Fieldwork date	Sample size	PSC	CiU	PP	ICV–EUiA	ERC	C's	Question	X mark	Lead
2011 municipal election	22 May 2011	—N/a	11.5	15.0	9.0	5.4	2.9	1.0	—N/a	47.0	3.5
CIS	17 Mar–17 Apr 2011	967	17.4	23.4	5.4	5.0	6.1	1.8	26.2	9.7	6.0
GESOP/El Periódico	21–22 Feb 2011	800	23.0	29.8	4.9	5.6	5.5	–	17.5	6.9	6.8
GESOP/El Periódico	31 Jan–1 Feb 2011	400	23.8	27.3	7.8	4.3	6.3	–	20.1	6.5	3.5
GESOP/El Periódico	31 Jan–1 Feb 2011	400	14.8	33.0	8.0	5.8	6.8	–	19.6	6.3	18.2
2010 regional election (Note: Does not include non-resident citizens.)	28 Nov 2010	—N/a	11.0	22.5	8.8	5.7	4.0	2.5	—N/a	37.7	11.5
DYM/City Council	10–19 Jun 2010	800	10.7	18.1	2.3	4.4	3.7	–	36.5	15.1	7.4
DYM/City Council	25 Nov–3 Dec 2009	800	17.1	17.0	2.4	4.8	4.0	–	29.1	18.8	0.1
DYM/City Council	15–23 Jun 2009	799	15.8	14.6	1.8	4.9	6.6	0.4	32.7	17.3	1.2
2009 EP election	7 Jun 2009	—N/a	13.2	8.7	8.3	3.2	3.4	0.2	—N/a	59.5	4.5
DYM/City Council	3–12 Dec 2008	800	23.9	19.6	3.6	7.9	5.9	0.4	23.7	10.8	4.3
DYM/City Council	16–27 Jun 2008	800	22.4	20.0	3.2	7.0	5.3	0.7	22.9	13.2	2.4
2008 general election	9 Mar 2008	—N/a	30.8	14.8	13.2	4.6	5.0	0.7	—N/a	27.8	16.0
Central de Campo/City Council	26–28 Sep 2007	800	23.4	14.0	3.8	7.4	6.5	0.9	23.2	10.2	9.4
2007 municipal election	27 May 2007	—N/a	14.8	12.6	7.7	4.6	4.4	1.9	—N/a	50.4	2.2

=== Victory preferences ===
The table below lists opinion polling on the victory preferences for each party in the event of a municipal election taking place.

Polling firm/Commissioner	Fieldwork date	Sample size	PSC	CiU	PP	ICV–EUiA	ERC	C's	Other/ None	Question	Lead
CIS	17 Mar–17 Apr 2011	967	20.9	27.7	6.3	6.8	6.2	1.9	10.1	20.1	6.8

=== Victory likelihood ===
The table below lists opinion polling on the perceived likelihood of victory for each party in the event of a municipal election taking place.

Polling firm/Commissioner	Fieldwork date	Sample size	PSC	CiU	PP	ICV–EUiA	ERC	C's	Other/ None	Question	Lead
GAD/COPE	9 May 2011	?	29.0	43.0	7.0	–	–	–	21.0		14.0
CIS	17 Mar–17 Apr 2011	967	19.6	46.8	3.6	0.1	0.4	0.5	0.3	28.5	27.2
GESOP/El Periódico	21–22 Feb 2011	800	23.6	51.9	4.0	0.1	0.4	–	0.1	19.9	28.3
Feedback/La Vanguardia	12–14 Jan 2011	600	18.4	57.3	–	–	–	–	1.3	23.0	38.9

=== Preferred Mayor ===
The table below lists opinion polling on leader preferences to become mayor of Barcelona.

All candidates

Polling firm/Commissioner	Fieldwork date	Sample size									Other/ None/ Not care	Question	Lead
Polling firm/Commissioner	Fieldwork date	Sample size	Hereu PSC	Tura PSC	Trias CiU	F. Díaz PP	Mayol ICV–EUiA	Gomà ICV–EUiA	Portabella ERC	Cañas C's	Other/ None/ Not care	Question	Lead
GAPS/CiU	26–29 Apr 2011	800	20.4	–	28.6	<7.0	–	<7.0	<7.0	–	<30.0		8.2
Noxa/La Vanguardia	25–27 Apr 2011	600	28.0	–	26.0	8.0	3.0	6.0	–	–	18.0	11.0	2.0
CIS	17 Mar–17 Apr 2011	967	17.9	–	23.8	3.5	–	2.2	6.6	0.7	7.7	37.6	5.9
GESOP/El Periódico	21–22 Feb 2011	800	19.3	2.6	15.9	1.4	1.5	1.8	–	–	57.5		3.4
GAPS/CiU	25–31 May 2010	817	10.4	–	28.3	6.9	–	2.8	7.0	–	20.6	24.0	17.9
GAPS/CiU	28 Nov–10 Dec 2009	805	16.6	–	23.0	7.2	–	5.0	9.0	–	19.3	19.9	6.4
Noxa/La Vanguardia	18–23 Nov 2009	1,000	25.0	–	22.0	7.0	–	10.0	9.0	–	18.0	7.0	3.0
GAPS/CiU	10–23 Mar 2009	810	22.8	–	23.3	5.9	–	2.5	8.0	–	18.6	21.6	0.5
GAPS/CiU	21–30 May 2008	804	16.8	–	18.3	6.1	7.5	–	7.2	–	22.7	21.4	1.5

Hereu vs. Trias

Polling firm/Commissioner	Fieldwork date	Sample size			Other/ None/ Not care	Question	Lead
Polling firm/Commissioner	Fieldwork date	Sample size	Hereu PSC	Trias CiU	Other/ None/ Not care	Question	Lead
Metroscopia/El País	10–11 May 2011	1,000	34.0	42.0	24.0		8.0
GAPS/CiU	26–29 Apr 2011	800	32.0	47.9	20.1		15.9
GESOP/El Periódico	21–22 Feb 2011	800	36.9	46.8	8.0	8.4	9.9
GESOP/El Periódico	31 Jan–1 Feb 2011	400	26.3	52.3	8.5	13.1	26.0
Feedback/La Vanguardia	12–14 Jan 2011	600	30.4	48.2	21.4		17.8
GAPS/CiU	25–31 May 2010	817	22.9	51.4	19.3	6.4	28.5
Noxa/La Vanguardia	24–27 May 2010	1,000	25.0	54.0	16.0	5.0	29.0
GAPS/CiU	28 Nov–10 Dec 2009	805	32.2	45.1	17.3	5.5	12.9
GESOP/El Periódico	1–3 Dec 2008	800	41.9	36.9	21.2		5.0

Tura vs. Trias

Polling firm/Commissioner	Fieldwork date	Sample size			Other/ None/ Not care	Question	Lead
Polling firm/Commissioner	Fieldwork date	Sample size	Tura PSC	Trias CiU	Other/ None/ Not care	Question	Lead
GESOP/El Periódico	31 Jan–1 Feb 2011	400	32.0	43.3	7.8	17.0	11.3
Feedback/La Vanguardia	12–14 Jan 2011	600	38.1	43.8	18.1		5.7

=== Predicted Mayor ===
The table below lists opinion polling on the perceived likelihood for each leader to become mayor.

Polling firm/Commissioner	Fieldwork date	Sample size						Other/ None/ Not care	Question	Lead
Polling firm/Commissioner	Fieldwork date	Sample size	Hereu PSC	Trias CiU	F. Díaz PP	Gomà ICV–EUiA	Portabella ERC	Other/ None/ Not care	Question	Lead
GAPS/CiU	26–29 Apr 2011	800	29.8	50.7	–	–	–	19.5		20.9
GAPS/CiU	25–31 May 2010	817	21.5	38.9	2.0	0.4	1.5	6.9	28.7	17.4
GAPS/CiU	28 Nov–10 Dec 2009	805	41.7	20.6	1.6	0.2	1.1	1.0	33.9	21.1

== Results ==
← Summary of the 22 May 2011 City Council of Barcelona election results →
Parties and alliances	Popular vote			Seats	
Parties and alliances	Votes	%	±pp	Total	+/−
Convergence and Union (CiU)	174,122	28.73	+3.27	14	+2
Socialists' Party of Catalonia–Municipal Progress (PSC–PM)	134,193	22.14	−7.77	11	−3
People's Party (PP)	104,475	17.24	+1.63	9	+2
Initiative for Catalonia Greens–EUiA–Agreement (ICV–EUiA–E)	62,979	10.39	+1.04	5	+1
Unity for Barcelona–Republican Left–Rally (UpB–ERC–RI.cat–DCat)	33,900	5.59	−3.22	2	−2
Popular Unity Candidacy–Alternative for Barcelona (CUP–AxB)	11,833	1.95	New	0	±0
Citizens–Party of the Citizenry (C's)	11,742	1.94	−1.94	0	±0
Blank Seats–Citizens for Blank Votes (EB–CenB)	10,115	1.67	+1.29	0	±0
Catalan Solidarity for Independence (SI)	6,823	1.13	New	0	±0
The Greens–European Green Group (EV–GVE)	6,128	1.01	New	0	±0
Pirates of Catalonia (Pirata.cat)	4,675	0.77	New	0	±0
Anti-Bullfighting Party Against Mistreatment of Animals (PACMA)	4,308	0.71	+0.21	0	±0
Platform for Catalonia (PxC)	3,405	0.56	+0.50	0	±0
For a Fairer World (PUM+J)	1,593	0.26	+0.14	0	±0
Union, Progress and Democracy (UPyD)	1,463	0.24	New	0	±0
Pensioners in Action Party (PDLPEA)	1,382	0.23	New	0	±0
The Barcelona of Neighbourhoods (LBB)	1,189	0.20	New	0	±0
Communist Party of the Catalan People (PCPC)	979	0.16	±0.00	0	±0
Open Your Eyes Party (PATO)	954	0.16	New	0	±0
Left Republican Party–Republican Left (PRE–IR)	710	0.12	−0.01	0	±0
Humanist Party (PH)	624	0.10	+0.03	0	±0
Family and Life Party (PFiV)	533	0.09	+0.01	0	±0
Spanish Phalanx of the CNSO (FE de las JONS)	349	0.06	New	0	±0
Internationalist Solidarity and Self-Management (SAIn)	246	0.04	+0.01	0	±0
Communist Unification of Spain (UCE)	219	0.04	New	0	±0
Blank ballots	27,107	4.47	+0.37		
Total	606,046			41	±0
Valid votes	606,046	98.30	−1.18		
Invalid votes	10,491	1.70	+1.18		
Votes cast / turnout	616,537	52.99	+3.37		
Abstentions	547,057	47.01	−3.37		
Registered voters	1,163,594				

Popular vote
CiU	28.73%
PSC–PM	22.14%
PP	17.24%
ICV–EUiA–E	10.39%
UpB–ERC–RI.cat	5.59%
CUP–AxB	1.95%
C's	1.94%
EB–CenB	1.67%
SI	1.13%
EV–GVE	1.01%
Others	3.73%
Blank ballots	4.47%

Seats
CiU	34.15%
PSC–PM	26.83%
PP	21.95%
ICV–EUiA–E	12.20%
UpB–ERC–RI.cat	4.88%

== Aftermath ==
=== Government formation ===
Investiture
Ballot →	1 July 2011	
Required majority →	21 out of 41	
Xavier Trias (CiU): • CiU (15); • UpB (2)	17 / 41	check
Jordi Hereu (PSC): • PSC (11)	11 / 41	X mark
Alberto Fernández Díaz (PP): • PP (8)	8 / 41	X mark
Ricard Gomà (ICV–EUiA): • ICV–EUiA (5)	5 / 41	X mark
Abstentions/Blank ballots	0 / 41	
Absentees	0 / 41	

== Bibliography ==
- Constitución Española (Constitution). Official State Gazette (in Spanish). 27 December 1978 [version as of 28 August 1992]. BOE-A-1978-31229.
- Ley 7/1985, de 2 de abril, Reguladora de las Bases del Régimen Local (Law 7/1985). Official State Gazette (in Spanish). 2 April 1985 [version as of 5 March 2011]. BOE-A-1985-5392.
- Ley Orgánica 5/1985, de 19 de junio, del Régimen Electoral General (Organic Law 5/1985). Official State Gazette (in Spanish). 19 June 1985 [version as of 30 April 2011]. BOE-A-1985-11672.
- Real Decreto 424/2011, de 28 de marzo, por el que se convocan elecciones locales y a las Asambleas de Ceuta y Melilla para el 22 de mayo de 2011 (Royal Decree 424/2011). Official State Gazette (in Spanish). 28 March 2011. BOE-A-2011-5608.
