= Alberto Fernández Díaz =

Spanish politician (born 1961)

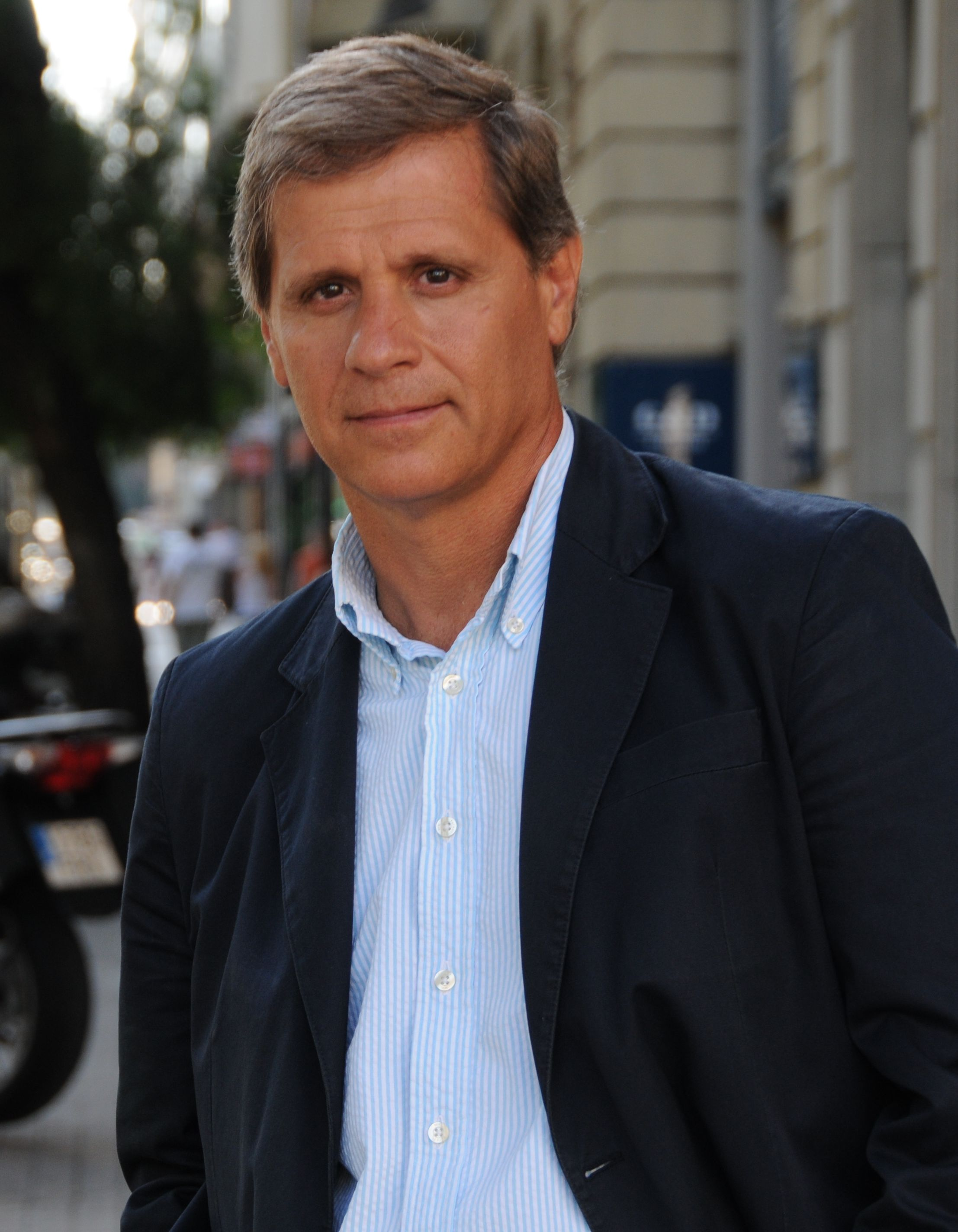

Alberto Fernández Díaz (born 12 December 1961) is a Spanish former politician of the People's Party (PP). He was a member of the City Council of Barcelona from 1987 to 1999 and again from 2003 to 2019, and led his party in the Parliament of Catalonia between his two mandates.

== Biography ==
Fernández Díaz was born in Barcelona as the eighth of ten children to a military father. His older brother Jorge was also a People's Party politician who served as minister of the interior from 2011 to 2016. Fernández Díaz graduated in law from the University of Barcelona in 1986 and practiced as a lawyer until 1996.

In 1980, Fernández Díaz joined the People's Party of Catalonia (PPC). He was first elected to the City Council of Barcelona in 1987 for the then People's Alliance (AP). He was the party's lead candidate in the 1999 Catalan regional election, in which he accused incumbent president Jordi Pujol of extreme Catalan nationalism. He was congratulated by the party's national secretary general Javier Arenas for promoting bilingualism by challenging Pujol in Spanish on the Catalan language television channel TV3. The party fell by five seats to 12 and lost 125,000 votes compared to its 1995 result. Nonetheless, the PP gave confidence and supply in order to allow Pujol's right-leaning Convergence and Union (CiU) to govern.

Fernández Díaz returned to municipal politics in 2003 as the PP candidate for mayor of Barcelona. He was assaulted in Reus during the campaign, by demonstrators angry with his party's involvement in the Iraq War. He was a candidate again in 2007 and 2011, achieving the party's best-ever result of nine seats in the latter. This figure rose from an initial eight due to an appeal to the Supreme Court of Spain and the Constitutional Court of Spain over 57 voting forms previously counted as spoilt votes.

In 2015, the party fell to three seats on the council while Citizens grew. In December 2018, with opinion polling suggesting that the PP could be wiped off the council, he announced that he would not stand again next year.

Fernández Díaz married in 1992 and had three children as of 2018. A motorcycle enthusiast, he unsuccessfully proposed allowing the vehicle to use Barcelona's cycle lanes. A fan of RCD Espanyol, he called out the local public television channel Betevé in 2019 for a programme attacking the club's fans as drug addicts and thieves. The show was eventually withdrawn from broadcasting.
