= Esperanza García =

Spanish lawyer and politician (1975–2025)

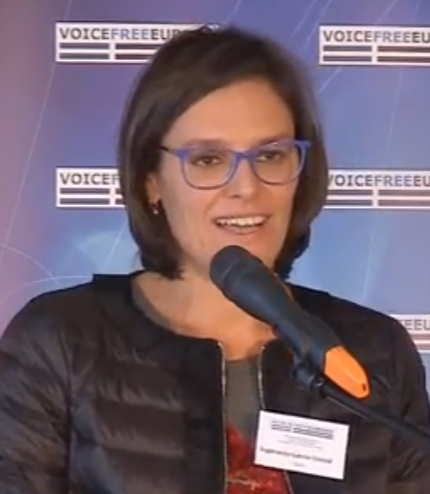

Member of the Parliament of Catalonia
- In office 2015–2017, 2019

Personal details
- Born: Esperanza García González; 1975 Barcelona, Spain
- Died: 19 June 2025 (aged 50)
- Education: University of Barcelona
- Occupation: Lawyer, politician

Esperanza García González (1975 – 19 June 2025) was a Spanish lawyer and politician.

== Biography ==
Born in Barcelona, she graduated from the University of Barcelona in 2000, specializing in procedural and international law. After graduation, she was a jurist for the Barcelona Bar Association from 2000 to 2015.

On 26 October 2015, she became a deputy in the Catalan parliament, holding the office until 2017. In 2019, she resumed the office for one year, following Xavier García Albiol's resignation. In 2023, she was appointed to be the delegate of the Regional Government of Andalusia in Catalonia by Andalusian President Juanma Moreno. She was also a Badalona city council member in Albiol's mayoral cabinet.

In 2023, García was diagnosed with cancer. She died from the disease on 19 June 2025, at the age of 50.
