= Joan Clos =

Spanish politician

Joan Clos i Matheu GCIH
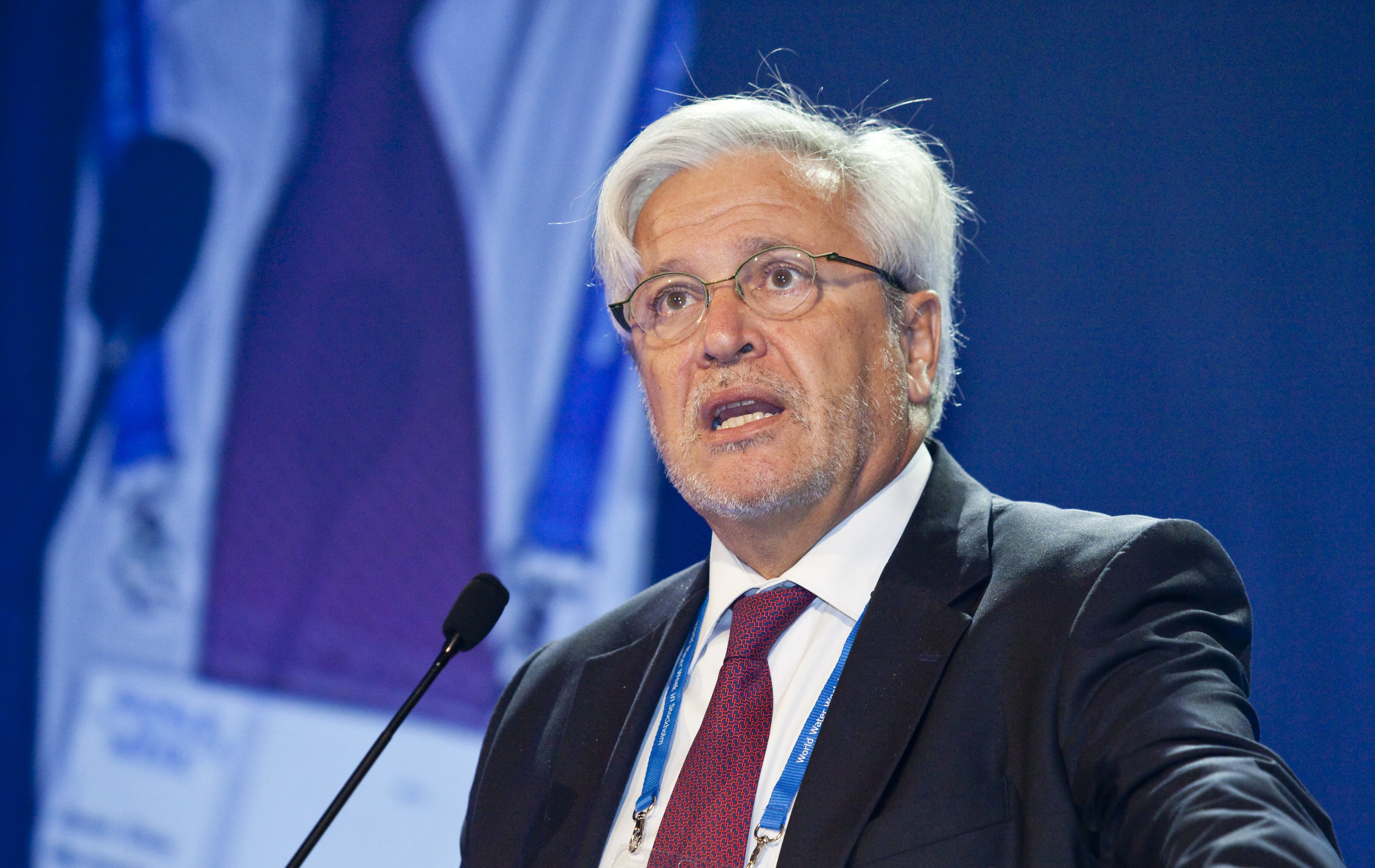
- Clos in 2011

Executive Director of the United Nations Human Settlements Programme (UN-Habitat)
- In office 18 October 2010 – 22 January 2018
- Preceded by: Anna Tibaijuka
- Succeeded by: Maimunah Mohd Sharif

115th Mayor of Barcelona
- In office 26 September 1997 – 8 September 2006
- Preceded by: Pasqual Maragall
- Succeeded by: Jordi Hereu

Minister of Industry
- In office 8 September 2006 – 12 April 2008
- Prime Minister: José Luis Rodríguez Zapatero
- Preceded by: José Montilla
- Succeeded by: Miguel Sebastián Gascón

Personal details
- Born: 29 June 1949 (age 77) Parets del Vallès, Catalonia, Spain
- Party: PSC

Joan Clos i Matheu, GCIH (Catalan pronunciation: [ʒuˈaŋ ˈklɔs]; born 29 June 1949) is a Spanish politician who was mayor of Barcelona, Spain from September 1997 to September 2006. He took over from Pasqual Maragall in 1997. In 1999 he was elected to a four-year term, and was then re-elected in the municipal elections of 25 May 2003. In September 2006, he left Barcelona Town Hall, after nine years of office, as he was appointed Minister of Industry, Tourism and Trade by Spanish Prime Minister José Luis Rodríguez Zapatero. After a stint as the Spanish Ambassador to Turkey and Azerbaijan, in 2010 he was appointed as executive director of the United Nations Human Settlements Programme, (UN-HABITAT), and Under Secretary General of the United Nations. Joan Clos is also president of the Spanish Chapter of The International Real Estate Federation (FIABCI).

== Beginnings ==
He graduated from the Autonomous University of Barcelona (UAB) with a degree in medicine and pursued his studies in the Sant Pau Hospital of Barcelona. During the political transition he took part in anti-Franco movements for the profession and the modernization of the healthcare services. He worked in the Analysis and Healthcare Programs Centre (CAPS) with a group of doctors who defended the political transformation of the country as a means for recovering professional dignity.

Once he graduated in medicine and after having worked for some time as an anaesthetist, he decided to change his professional career and moved into epidemiology, community medicine and healthcare resources management. He studied his specialty at the University of Barcelona, in the United States and in Edinburgh (Scotland). Between 1981 and 1991 he was the chairman of the Spanish Society of Epidemiology and Healthcare Administration.

== Political career ==
Continuing this process of involvement and dedication to healthcare management, he joined the Barcelona municipal government as director of healthcare services. In 1993 he was elected councillor on the Barcelona Council for the PSC (Catalonia Socialist Party).

Achieving efficient municipal management and “city making” have been two constant features that have marked his municipal career. He thus directed the regeneration project for the neighbourhood of Ciutat Vella, following a comprehensive plan that combined planning intervention, financial and social investment and facilities strengthening in order to open up this district to the city and to improve the quality of life for its residents. In 1999, the Royal Institute of British Architects (RIBA) awarded the City of Barcelona the Royal Gold Medal personified in the men who have driven the transformation of the city: Narcís Serra, Pasqual Maragall and Joan Clos.

As second deputy mayor with direct responsibility for organisation, economy and treasury, he started a thorough reorganisation of the economic and financial structure of the City Hall with the aim of reaching budgetary stability and, at the same time, establishing a consistent investment programme to tackle the period after the Olympic Games with new projects.

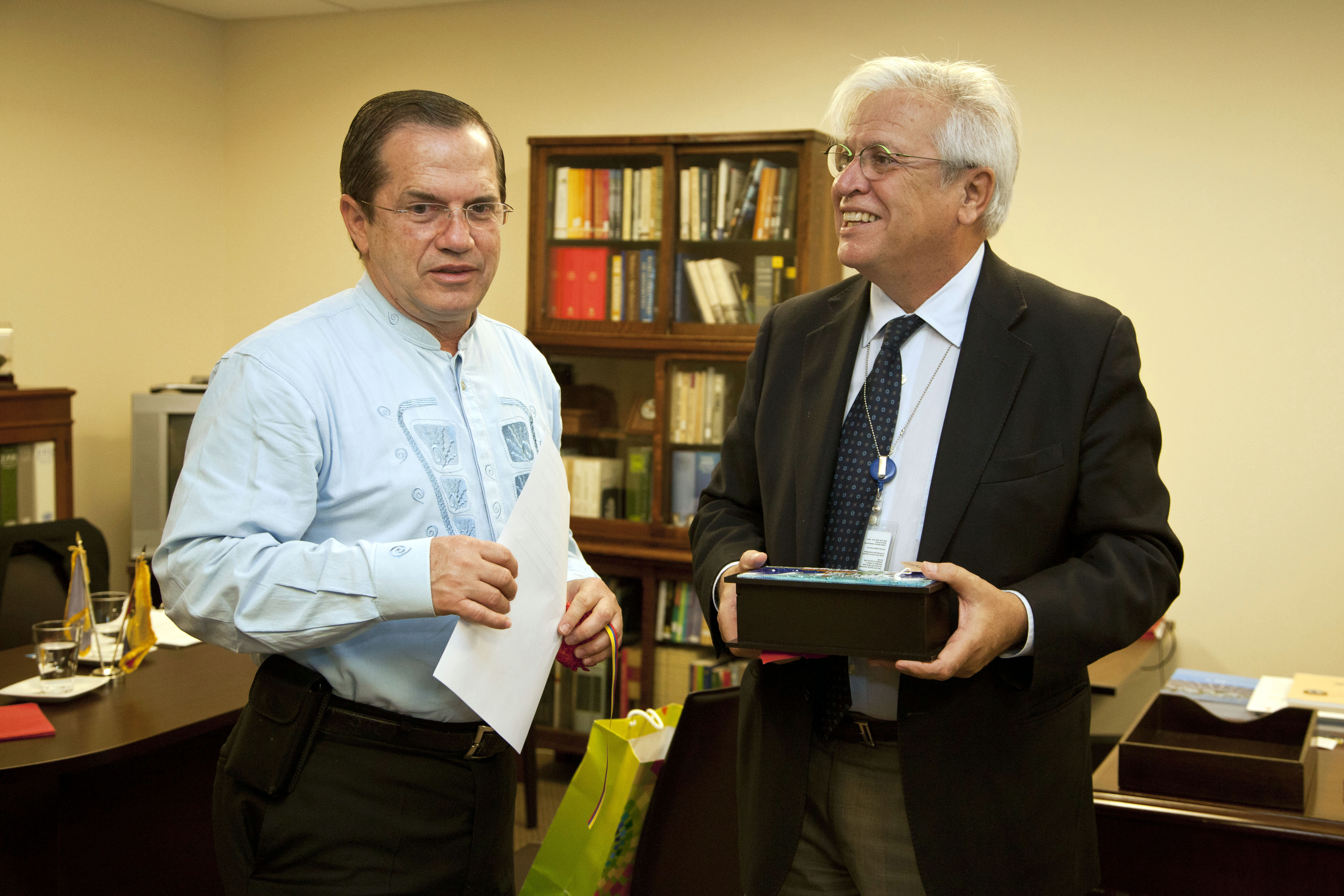
Clos meeting with Ecuadorian Foreign Minister Ricardo Patiño at the UN in New York City (September 2013)

His mayor’s office was enhanced by the design, preparation and holding of the first Universal Forum of Cultures, held in Barcelona during the summer 2004 and by the consequent development of the area of Besós and Diagonal Mar, a project of urban development ten times as big as the one Barcelona went through for the Olympic Games in 1992. The project 22@, a new technological neighbourhood built on the old Poblenou, together with the reorganisation of La Sagrera, are another two examples of his urbanistic activities as Mayor of Barcelona.

In September 2006, the Spanish prime minister José Luis Rodríguez Zapatero appointed Clos minister of industry, tourism and trade. In July 2008, he became the Spanish ambassador in Turkey and Azerbaijan. Since 18 October 2010, he is the executive director of the United Nations Human Settlements Programme, UN-HABITAT, and under secretary general of the United Nations.

In 2012 the secretary general of the United Nations, Ban Ki-moon, appointed Clos secretary-general of the Habitat III Conference and to act as a focal point on behalf of the United Nations.

== Awards and honours ==
Clos has received a number of awards, including a gold medal from the Royal Institute of British Architects in 1999 for transforming Barcelona. In 2002, he won the UN-Habitat Scroll of Honour Award for encouraging global cooperation between local authorities and the United Nations.

=== Honours ===
- Grand-Cross of the Order of Prince Henry, Portugal (25 September 2006)

== Scandals ==
On 4 February 2006, a local police was seriously injured during the eviction of an illegal party held in a squatted theatre owned by the Barcelona city council. The initial version of the events given by Joan Clos to the press described the policeman being hit in the head by a flower pot thrown from one of the windows of the theatre and suffering a vertebra fracture as a result. This version was later changed to fit the official version given by the police, two of whom were later found to have been tortured the detainees and to have fabricated evidence and lied in court in a different case. Five young people were condemned to up to five years in prison solely based on the second version of these events. One of the condemned, poet Patricia Heras committed suicide during prison leave. These events were later described in detail in the award-winning documentary Ciutat morta.

== Bibliography ==
Clos i Matheu, Joan. España, China e India: cooperación y oportunidades (Spain and China: cooperation and opportunities). In: Economía industrial. ISSN 0422-2784, Nº 362, 2006 (Volume dedicated to: China and India: opportunities and strategies), p. 15-18.*(Spanish)

Clos i Matheu, Joan. Las crisis sanitarias vistas desde el Ayuntamiento (Public health crisis from the city hall viewpoint). In: Revista de administración sanitaria siglo XXI. ISSN 1696-1641, Vol. 4, Nº 3, 2006, p. 407-409. * (Spanish)]

Clos i Matheu, Joan. El Fòrum Universal de les Cultures, Barcelona 2004 (The Universal Forum of Cultures) Ed. Imatge i producció Editorial, Ajuntament de Barcelona, Barcelona, 2003.

Clos i Matheu, Joan. Convivència, seguretat i justícia a Barcelona : conferència de l'alcalde de Barcelona, Excm. Sr. Joan Clos. (Coexistence, security and justice in Barcelona: a conference by the Mayor of Barcelona, His Excellency M. Joan Clos) Ed. Fundació Carles Pi i Sunyer, Barcelona, 2002.

Clos i Matheu, Joan. El conocimiento, eje vertebrador de la Barcelona del futuro (Knowledge, the vertebrating axis of Barcelona’s future). In: Papeles y memorias de la Real Academia de Ciencias Morales y Políticas. ISSN 1576-2971, Nº 9, 2001 (Volume dedicated to: Innovation and technological development), p. 198-213. *(Spanish)

Clos i Matheu, Joan. 20 anys d'ajuntaments democràtics (20 years of democratic city councils). in: Papers de la Fundació. ISSN 1138-4514, Nº 114, 1999.

Clos i Matheu, Joan. La Empresa Pública Local: La experiencia de Barcelona (Local public enterprise: the experience of Barcelona). In: Presupuesto y gasto público. ISSN 0210-5977, Nº 16, 1995, p. 159-164.

Clos i Matheu, Joan; Seculi, Elisa; Segura, Andreu; preface by Ramon Espasa i Oliver. L'assitencia sanitaria a les comarques de Catalunya (Healthcare in the Catalan regions) Ed. Laia, Barcelona, 1980.

Political offices
| Preceded by Pasqual Maragall | Mayor of Barcelona; 1997–2006 | Succeeded by Jordi Hereu |
| Preceded by José Montilla | Minister of Industry, Trade and Tourism; 2006–2008 | Succeeded by Miguel Sebastián Gascón |
| Preceded by Anna Tibaijuka | Executive Director of the United Nations Human Settlements Programme (UN-HABITAT); 2010– | Succeeded by |
