= Jordi Portabella =

Spanish politician

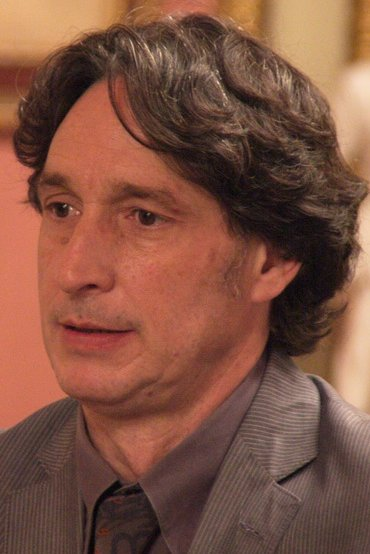
- Jordi Portabella in 2014

Personal details
- Born: January 10, 1961 (age 64); Barcelona, Spain
- Political party: Republican Left of Catalonia

Jordi Portabella (born in 1961 in Barcelona) was a member of the Catalan Parliament (1992-1999) and president of ERC in the City Hall of Barcelona (1999-2015).

From 2019 to 2022, he was the Director General of the Catalan Foundation for Research and Innovation.

Since 2021, he has been the Director of Sustainability at FC Barcelona.
