= Jordi Hereu =

Spanish politician

The Most Excellent Jordi Hereu i Boher
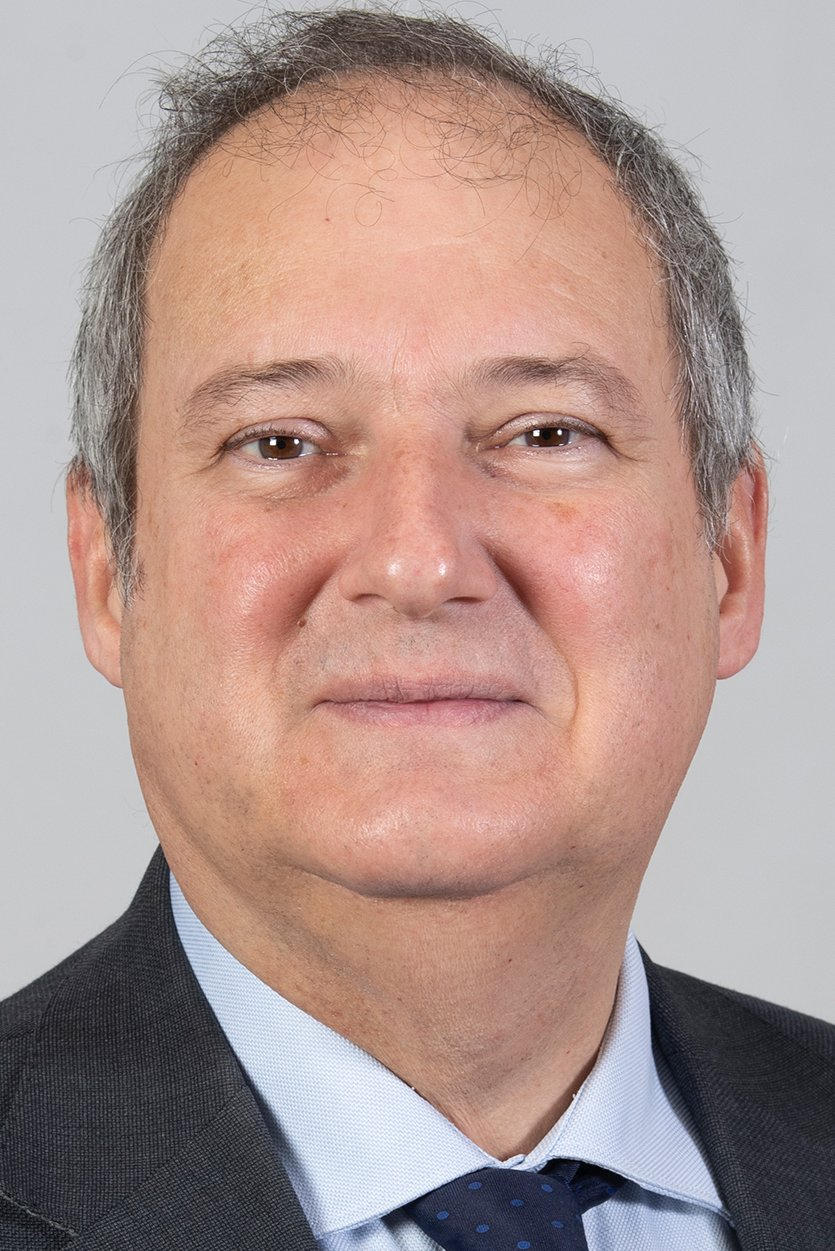
- Official portrait, 2023

Minister of Industry and Tourism
- Incumbent
- Assumed office 21 November 2023
- Monarch: Felipe VI
- Prime Minister: Pedro Sánchez
- Preceded by: Héctor Gómez

116th Mayor of Barcelona
- In office 8 September 2006 – 1 July 2011
- Preceded by: Joan Clos
- Succeeded by: Xavier Trias

Member of the Barcelona City Council
- In office 13 June 1999 – 13 February 2012

Personal details
- Born: 14 June 1965 (age 61) Barcelona, Spain
- Party: Socialists' Party of Catalonia (1987–present)
- Children: 2
- Education: Escola Superior d'Administració i Direcció d'Empreses; ESADE Business School

Jordi Hereu i Boher (Catalan pronunciation: [ˈʒɔɾði əˈɾɛw]; born 14 June 1965) is a Spanish politician, serving as minister of Industry and Tourism since 2023. He was mayor of Barcelona from 2006 to 2011. He is married, has two children and holds an MBA in business administration from the ESADE Business School.

He studied marketing at the city's ESADE business school and was later involved in intermodal logistics activities for the Port of Barcelona in which the City Council is one of the major shareholders. He was successively appointed to managing the Districts of Sant Andreu, Les Corts and Gràcia at Barcelona City Council. Jordi Hereu became City Councillor for Security and Transportation in 2003. On 30 August 2006 Hereu was designated as the future Mayor of Barcelona, replacing Joan Clos after the latter was appointed the Minister for Industry. Jordi Hereu took office on 7 September. Hereu formed a minority government with ICV after the May 2007 elections. In the 2011 elections he lost to Xavier Trias.

In 2012 he left all his political responsibilities to focus on the private sector. He is co-founder of Fledge Barcelona and presides the business hub Barcelona Plataforma Empresarial and IdenCity. He is a founding signatory of the Barcelona manifesto, which since 2018 made Barcelona the first city in the world with a science and technology diplomacy strategy.

In November 2023, he was appointed Minister of Industry and Tourism in the third government of Pedro Sánchez.

Government offices
| Preceded by Joan Clos | Mayor of Barcelona; 2006–2011 | Succeeded by Xavier Trias |
