= Xavier Trias =

Spanish politician (born 1946)

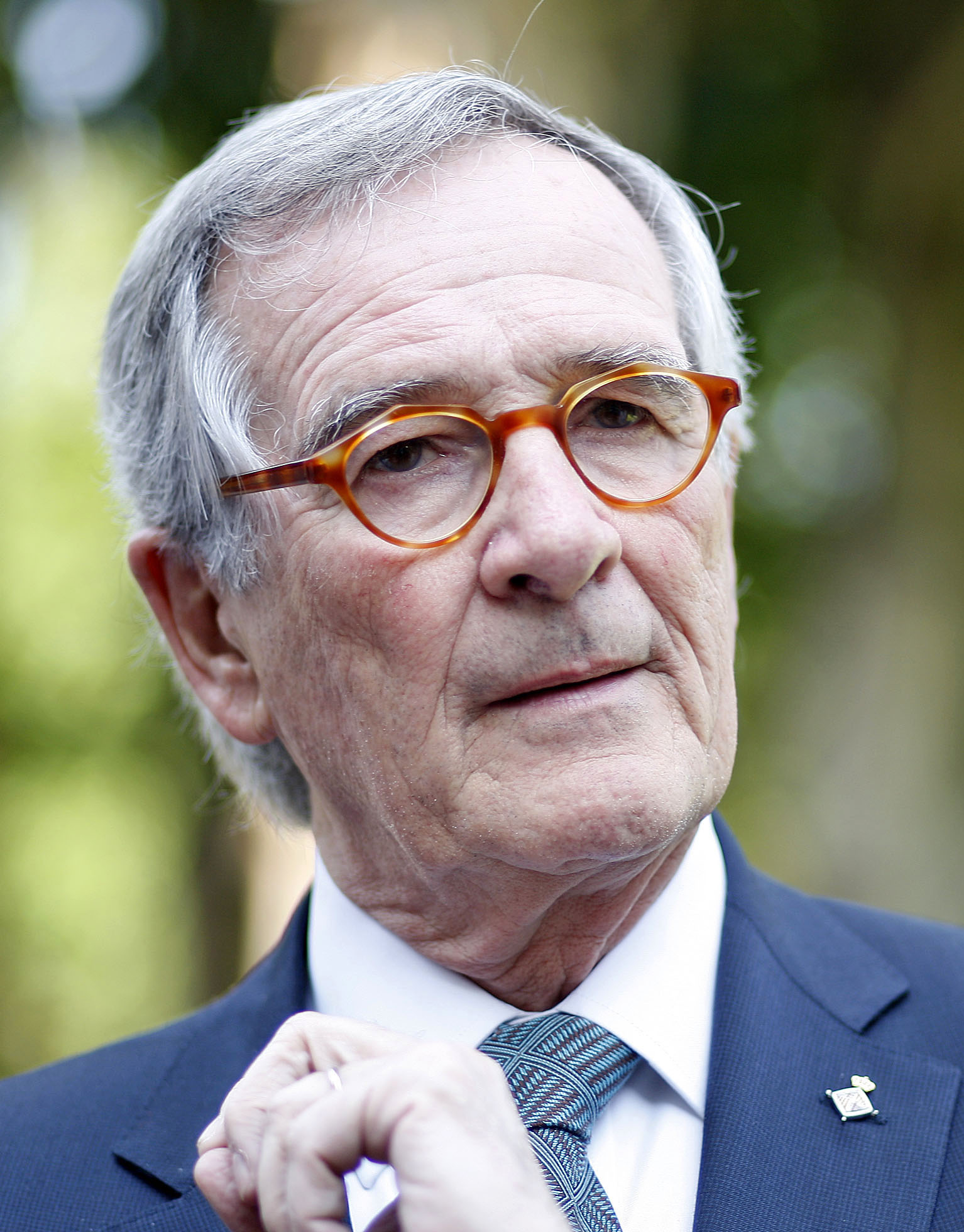
- Trias in 2014

117th Mayor of Barcelona
- In office 1 July 2011 – 13 June 2015
- First Deputy: Joaquim Forn
- Preceded by: Jordi Hereu
- Succeeded by: Ada Colau

Member of the Barcelona City Council
- In office 17 June 2023 – 26 July 2024
- Succeeded by: Carme Lleó Ribal
- In office 16 June 2003 – 15 June 2019

Minister of the Presidency of Catalonia
- In office 11 January 1996 – 3 February 2000
- President: Jordi Pujol
- Preceded by: Joaquim Triadú
- Succeeded by: Artur Mas

Minister of Health of Catalonia
- In office 4 July 1988 – 11 January 1996
- President: Jordi Pujol
- Preceded by: Josep Laporte
- Succeeded by: Eduard Rius

Member of the Congress of Deputies
- In office 12 March 2000 – 2 April 2004
- Constituency: Barcelona

Member of the Parliament of Catalonia
- In office 3 April 1992 – 25 January 2000
- Constituency: Barcelona

Personal details
- Born: Xavier Trias i Vidal de Llobatera; 5 August 1946 (age 80) Barcelona, Catalonia, Spain
- Party: Together for Catalonia (since 2022)
- Other political affiliations: CDC (until 2016); PDeCAT (2016–2022)
- Children: 4
- Education: University of Barcelona
- Profession: Pediatrician

Xavier Trias i Vidal de Llobatera (Catalan pronunciation: [ʃəβiˈe ˈtɾi.əz i βiˈðal də ʎuβəˈteɾə]; born 5 August 1946) is a Catalan politician, member of Together for Catalonia and was Mayor of Barcelona from July 2011 to June 2015. Among other responsibilities to the Government of Catalonia, he was Minister of Health and of the Presidency for various Jordi Pujol Governments.

== Biography ==
Xavier Trias i Vidal de Llobatera was born in Barcelona on 5 August 1946. He is married, has four children and six grandchildren. He has been a member of Democratic Convergence of Catalonia since 1979. He received a degree in Medicine and Surgery from the University of Barcelona in 1970, specializing in pediatrics. Between 1971 and 1973 he completed his post graduate training in Genoa, Italy and Bern, Switzerland, where he worked for a year and a half in the investigation of metabolic diseases, their diagnosis and treatment.

From 1974 to 1981 he served as a pediatrician at the Children's Hospital in Vall d'Hebron. Between 1979 and 1981 was member of national hospitals in the "General Council of Doctors in Spain", and also member of the Board of Hospitals Association of Physicians of Barcelona.

In 1981, he started working Head of Hospital Care, at the Department of Health and Social Security of the Generalitat of Catalonia, headed by the Minister Josep Laporte, who Trias consider as his political father. In September 1983 he assumed ownership of the Directorate General of Health Planning.

In July 1984 he was appointed Director General of the Catalan Institute of Health (ICS), a post he held until his appointment as Minister of Health in July 1988, precisely in place of Laporte. With the Minister Laporte, Trias is considered responsible for the promotion and development of the Catalan health care model, prestige and international recognition.

On 12 January 1996 was appointed Minister of the Presidency, and began to work closely with President Jordi Pujol. In this era, the government created the Catalonia Broadcasting Council (CAC), and improved the labor regime for the officials of the Generalitat, with progress in reconciling family life, among other initiatives.

In March 2000, he was a candidate of Convergence and Union (CiU) for election to Congress. He won and became President and Spokesperson for the Catalan Parliamentary Group of the Congress of Deputies, and Chairman of the Committee on Science and Technology.

On 5 June 2010 he was proclaimed a CiU candidate for the Barcelona City Council, a post he had already held since 14 June 2003 as well as being Chairman of the Municipal Group of CiU. On 22 May he won the elections receiving 29% of the votes and becoming the new mayor on 2 July. In July 2011 he inaugurated the 5th edition of The Brandery show.

On 29 March 2020, during COVID-19 pandemic in Spain, Trias was admitted to hospital after testing positive for COVID-19 and was discharged on 7 April.

== Controversy ==
=== Paradise Papers ===
In November 2017 an investigation conducted by the International Consortium of Investigative Journalism cited his name in the list of politicians named in the Paradise Papers allegations.
