= 2023 Barcelona municipal election =

Election in the Spanish municipality of Barcelona

- 28 May 2023

All 41 seats in the City Council of Barcelona 21 seats needed for a majority
- Opinion polls
- Registered: 1,109,116 ▼2.9%
- Turnout: 672,053 (60.6%) ▼5.6 pp
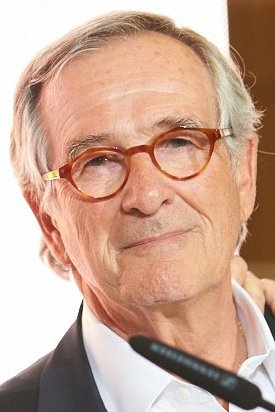

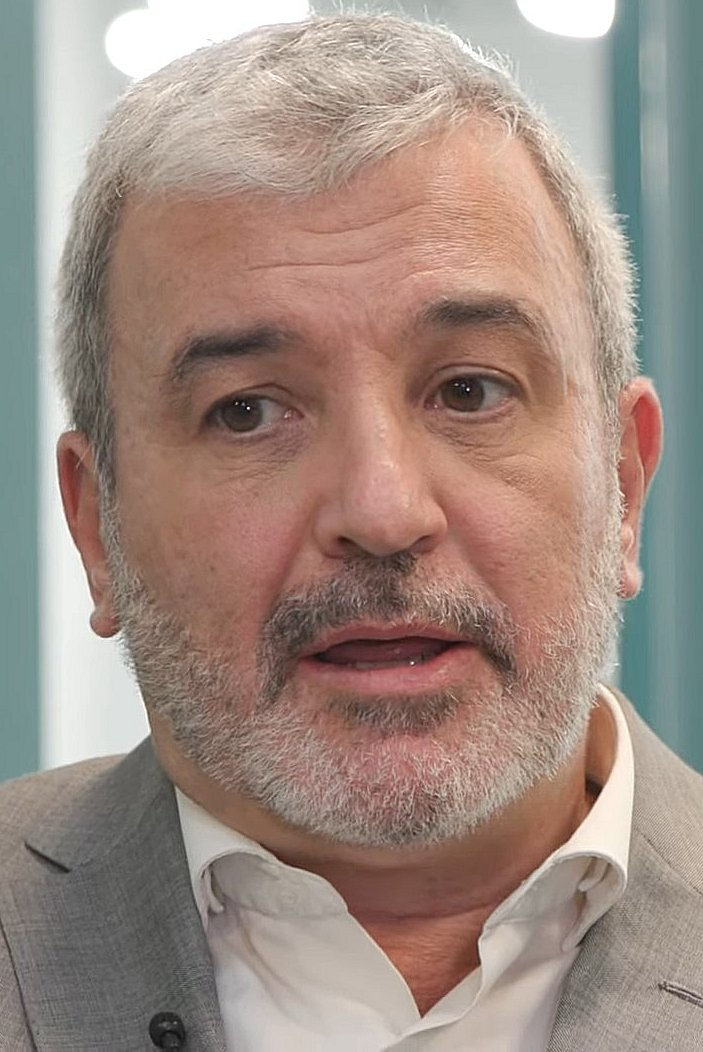

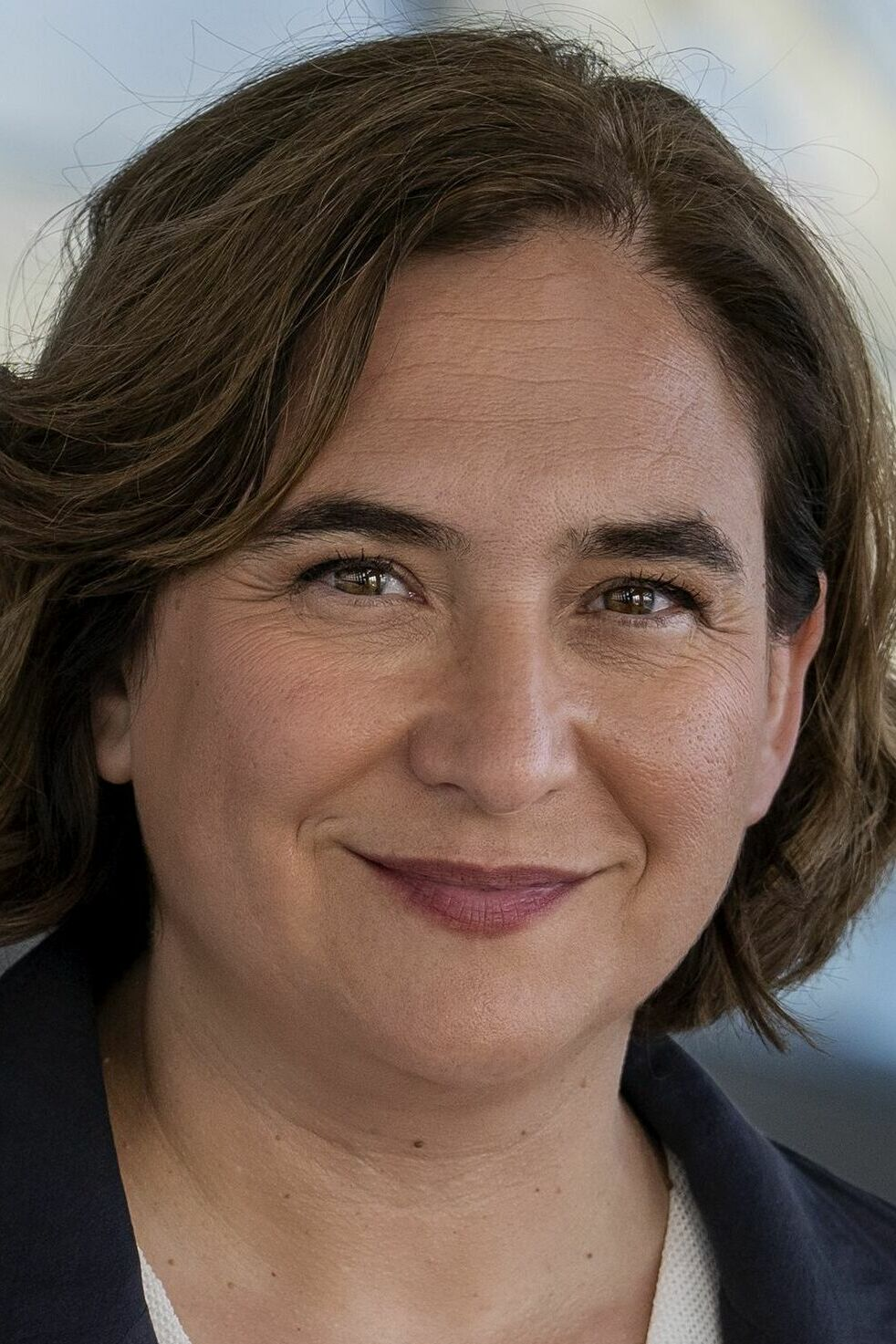

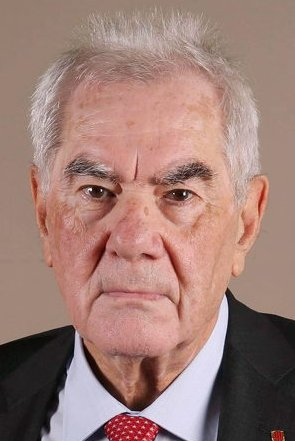

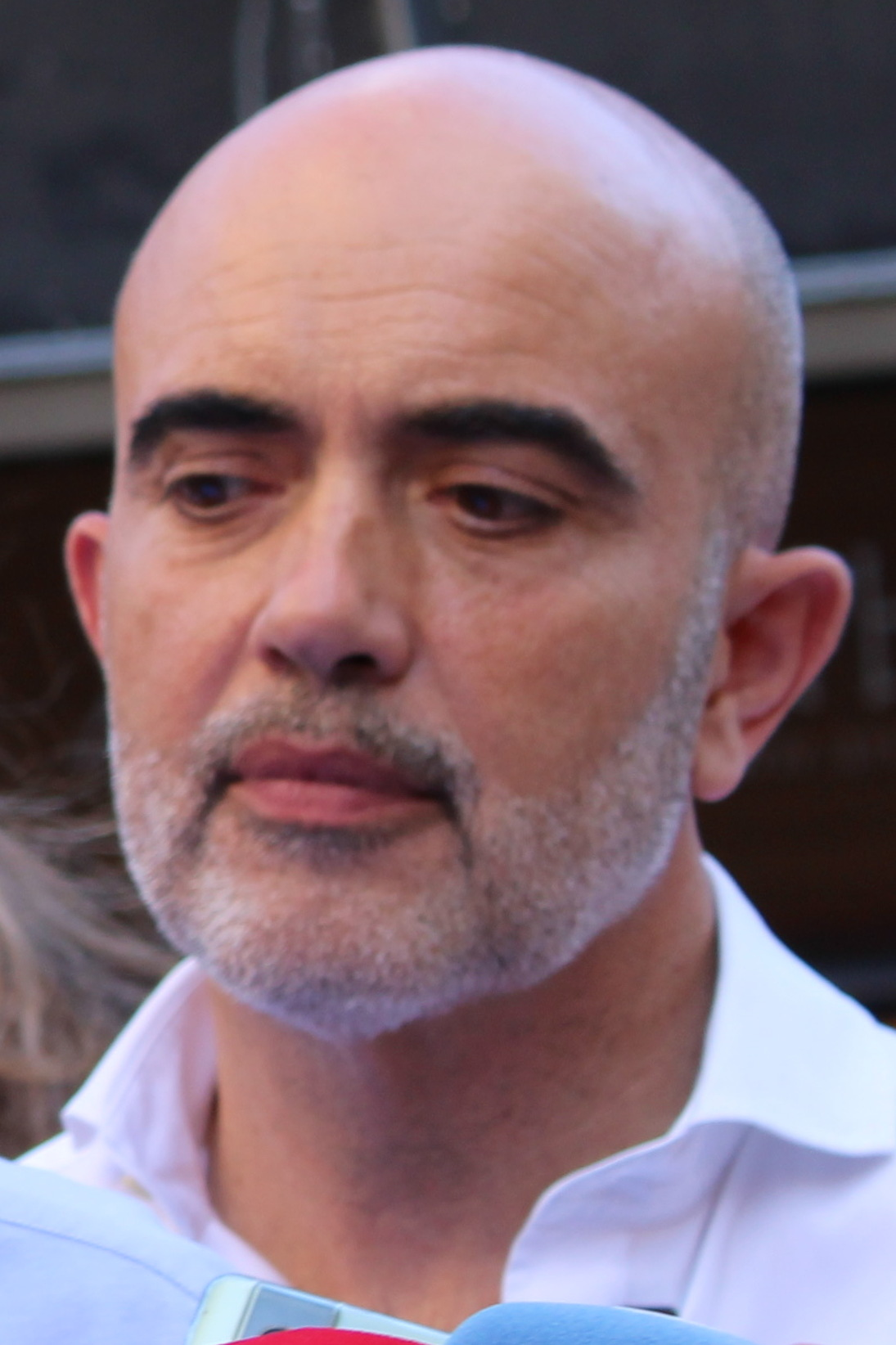

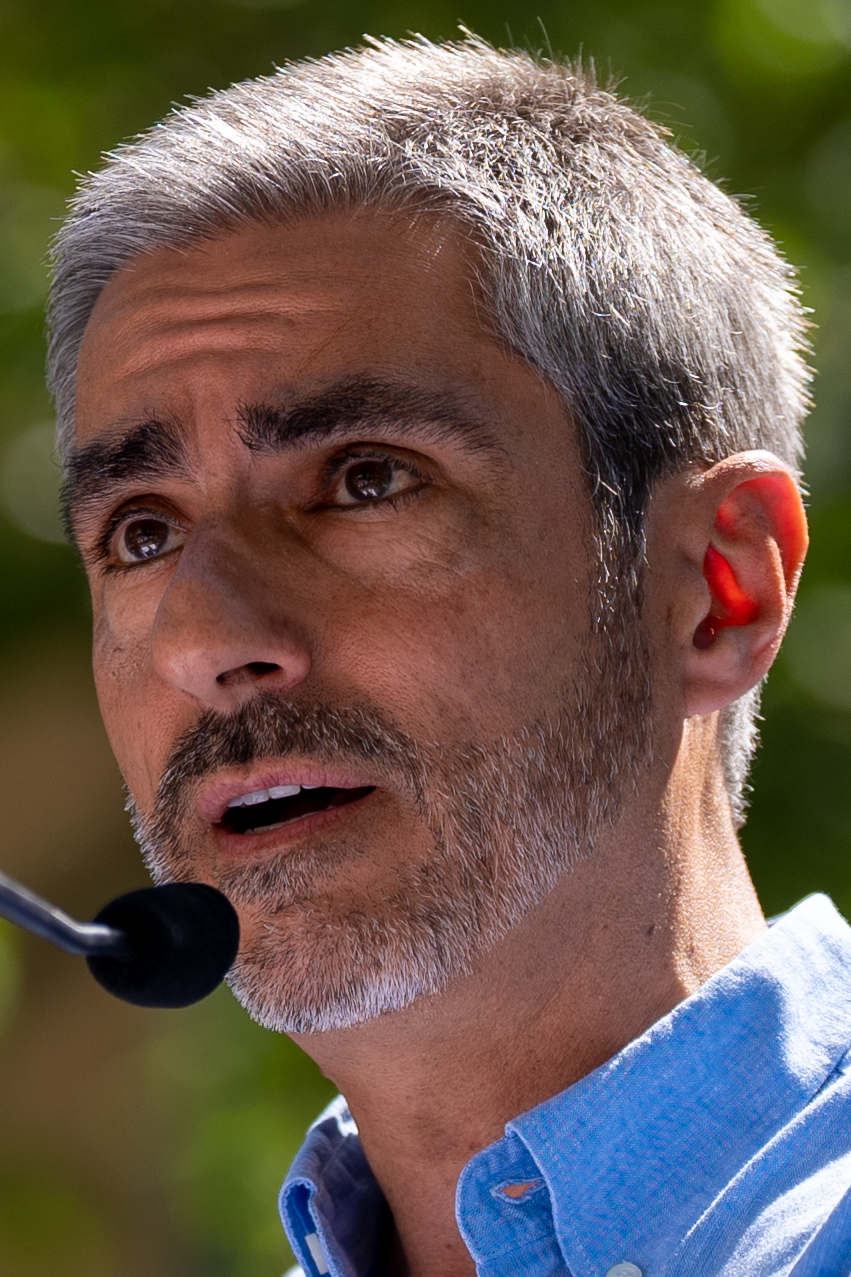
	First party	Second party	Third party
Leader	Xavier Trias	Jaume Collboni	Ada Colau
Party	TriasxBCN–CM	PSC–CP	BComú–C
Leader since	12 December 2022	5 May 2014	14 March 2015
Last election	5 seats, 10.5% (Note: Results for Junts in the 2019 election.)	8 seats, 18.4%	10 seats, 20.7%
Seats won	11	10	9
Seat change	▲6	▲2	▼1
Popular vote	149,479	131,923	131,581
Percentage	22.5%	19.8%	19.8%
Swing	▲12.0 pp	▲1.4 pp	▼0.9 pp
	Fourth party	Fifth party	Sixth party
Leader	Ernest Maragall	Daniel Sirera	Gonzalo de Oro
Party	ERC–AM	PP	Vox
Leader since	27 October 2018	9 January 2023	5 January 2023
Last election	10 seats, 21.4%	2 seats, 5.0%	0 seats, 1.2%
Seats won	5	4	2
Seat change	▼5	▲2	▲2
Popular vote	74,804	61,362	37,990
Percentage	11.2%	9.2%	5.7%
Swing	▼10.2 pp	▲4.2 pp	▲4.5 pp
Mayor before election
Ada Colau
BComú
Mayor after election
Jaume Collboni
PSC

A municipal election was held in Barcelona on 28 May 2023 to elect the 12th City Council of the municipality. All 41 seats in the City Council were up for election. It was held concurrently with regional elections in twelve autonomous communities and local elections all across Spain.

Incumbent mayor Ada Colau's party, Barcelona in Common (BComú), fell to third place behind Xavier Trias-led Together for Catalonia (JxCat) alliance and the Socialists' Party of Catalonia (PSC), which scored its best result since 2011. PSC's Jaume Collboni was able to become the new city's mayor following an alliance with BComú and the surprise support of the People's Party (PP), which aimed at preventing the city's government from falling into the hands of pro-Catalan independence parties.

== Overview ==
Under the 1978 Constitution, the governance of municipalities in Spain—part of the country's local government system—was centered on the figure of city councils (Spanish: ayuntamientos), local corporations with independent legal personality composed of a mayor, a government council and an elected legislative assembly. The mayor was indirectly elected by the local assembly, requiring an absolute majority; otherwise, the candidate from the most-voted party automatically became mayor (ties were resolved by drawing lots). In the case of Barcelona, the top-tier administrative and governing body was the City Council of Barcelona.

=== Date ===
The term of local assemblies in Spain expired four years after the date of their previous election, with election day being fixed for the fourth Sunday of May every four years. The election decree was required to be issued no later than 54 days before the scheduled election date and published on the following day in the Official State Gazette (BOE). The previous local elections were held on 26 May 2019, setting the date for election day on the fourth Sunday of May four years later, which was 28 May 2023.

Local assemblies could not be dissolved before the expiration of their term, except in cases of mismanagement that seriously harmed the public interest and implied a breach of constitutional obligations, in which case the Council of Ministers could—optionally—decide to call a by-election.

Elections to the assemblies of local entities were officially called on 4 April 2023 with the publication of the corresponding decree in the BOE, setting election day for 28 May.

=== Electoral system ===
Voting for local assemblies was based on universal suffrage, comprising all Spanish nationals over 18 years of age, registered and residing in the municipality and with full political rights (provided that they had not been deprived of the right to vote by a final sentence), as well as resident non-national European citizens, and those whose country of origin allowed reciprocal voting by virtue of a treaty.

Local councillors were elected using the D'Hondt method and closed-list proportional voting, with a five percent-threshold of valid votes (including blank ballots) in each municipality. Each municipality was a multi-member constituency, with a number of seats based on the following scale:

Population	Councillors
<100	3
101–250	5
251–1,000	7
1,001–2,000	9
2,001–5,000	11
5,001–10,000	13
10,001–20,000	17
20,001–50,000	21
50,001–100,000	25
>100,001	+1 per each 100,000 inhabitants or fraction +1 if total is an even number

The law did not provide for by-elections to fill vacant seats; instead, any vacancies arising after the proclamation of candidates and during the legislative term were filled by the next candidates on the party lists or, when required, by designated substitutes.

=== Outgoing council ===
The table below shows the composition of the political groups in the local assembly at the time of the election call.

Council composition in April 2023
Groups	Parties	Councillors	
Groups	Parties	Seats	Total
Republican Municipal Group	ERC	9	10
Republican Municipal Group	Nova	1	10
Barcelona in Common's Municipal Group	BComú	10	10
Socialist Municipal Group	PSC	7	8
Socialist Municipal Group	Els Units	1	8
Together for Catalonia's Municipal Group	JxCat	5	5
Citizens's Municipal Group	CS	3	3
People's Party's Municipal Group	PP	2	2
Brave's Municipal Group	Valents	2	2
Non-Inscrits	INDEP	1 (Note: Marilén Barceló, former Cs councillor.)	1

== Parties and candidates ==
The electoral law allowed for parties and federations registered in the interior ministry, alliances and groupings of electors to present lists of candidates. Parties and federations intending to form an alliance were required to inform the relevant electoral commission within 10 days of the election call, whereas groupings of electors needed to secure the signature of a determined amount of the electors registered in the municipality for which they sought election, disallowing electors from signing for more than one list. In the case of Barcelona, as its population was over 1,000,001, at least 8,000 signatures were required. Additionally, a balanced composition of men and women was required in the electoral lists, so that candidates of either sex made up at least 40 percent of the total composition.

Below is a list of the main parties and alliances which contested the election:

Candidacy	Parties and alliances	Leading candidate	Ideology	Previous result		Gov.	Ref.
Candidacy	Parties and alliances	Leading candidate	Ideology	Vote %	Seats	Gov.	Ref.
ERC–AM	List: Republican Left of Catalonia (ERC)	Ernest Maragall	Catalan independence Left-wing nationalism Social democracy	21.4%	10	No	
BComú–C	List: Barcelona in Common (BComú); Catalonia in Common (CatComú) – United Left Catalonia (EUCat) – Equo (Equo); In Common We Can (ECP)	Ada Colau	Left-wing populism Participatory democracy	20.7%	10	Yes	
PSC–CP	List: Socialists' Party of Catalonia (PSC–PSOE); United to Advance (Els Units)	Jaume Collboni	Social democracy	18.4%	8	Yes	
CS	List: Citizens–Party of the Citizenry (CS)	Anna Grau	Liberalism	13.2%	6	No	
Valents	List: Brave (Valents)	Eva Parera	Liberalism	13.2%	6	No	
TxBCN–CM	List: Together for Catalonia (JxCat); Catalan European Democratic Party (PDeCAT); Democrats of Catalonia (DC); Left Movement (MES)	Xavier Trias	Catalan independence Liberalism; Christian democracy	10.5%	5	No	
PP	List: People's Party (PP)	Daniel Sirera	Conservatism; Christian democracy	5.0%	2	No	
CUP	List: Popular Unity Candidacy (CUP); Internationalist Struggle (LI)	Basha Changue	Catalan independence Socialism	3.9%	0	No	
Vox	List: Vox (Vox)	Gonzalo de Oro	Right-wing populism Ultranationalism; National conservatism	1.2%	0	No	

== Campaign ==
=== Party slogans ===
Party or alliance	Original slogan	English translation	Ref.
ERC–AM	« L’alcalde de tothom »	"Everyone's mayor"	
BComú–C	« Barcelona obre camí »	"Barcelona paves the way"	
PSC–CP	« De nou Barcelona »	"Barcelona again"	
CS	« Libérate »	"Break free"	
Valents	« Barcelona grande otra vez »	"Barcelona great again"	
TxBCN–CM	« Fem-ho »	"Let's do it"	
PP	« Recupera Barcelona »	"Recover Barcelona"	

=== Debates ===
2023 Barcelona municipal election debates
Date	Organizer(s)	Moderator(s)	P Present (Note: Denotes a main invitee attending the event.) S Surrogate (Note: Denotes a main invitee not attending the event, sending a surrogate in their place.) NI Not invited I Invited A Absent invitee								
Date	Organizer(s)	Moderator(s)	ERC	BComú	PSC	CS	Valents	TxBCN	PP	Audience	Ref.
10 May	RTVE	Gemma Nierga; Quim Barnola	P Maragall	P Colau	P Collboni	P Grau	P Parera	P Trias	P Sirera	3.6% (54,000)	
23 May	CCMA	Laura Rosel; Ariadna Oltra	P Maragall	P Colau	P Collboni	P Grau	P Parera	P Trias	P Sirera	12.1% (214,000)	

== Opinion polls ==
The tables below list opinion polling results in reverse chronological order, showing the most recent first and using the dates when the survey fieldwork was done, as opposed to the date of publication. Where the fieldwork dates are unknown, the date of publication is given instead. The highest percentage figure in each polling survey is displayed with its background shaded in the leading party's colour. If a tie ensues, this is applied to the figures with the highest percentages. The "Lead" column on the right shows the percentage-point difference between the parties with the highest percentages in a poll.

=== Graphical summary ===
Local regression trend line of poll results from 26 May 2019 to 28 May 2023, with each line corresponding to a political party.

=== Voting intention estimates ===
The table below lists weighted voting intention estimates. Refusals are generally excluded from the party vote percentages, while question wording and the treatment of "don't know" responses and those not intending to vote may vary between polling organisations. When available, seat projections determined by the polling organisations are displayed below (or in place of) the percentages in a smaller font; 21 seats were required for an absolute majority in the City Council of Barcelona.

Color key:

Poll conducted after legal ban on opinion polls

Polling firm/Commissioner	Fieldwork date	Sample size	Turnout	ERC	BComú	PSC	CS	JxCat	PP	CUP	Vox	Valents	PDeCAT	R	BET	Lead
2023 municipal election	28 May 2023	—N/a	60.6	11.2; 5	19.8; 9	19.8; 10	1.1; 0	22.5; 11	9.2; 4	3.8; 0	5.7; 2	2.3; 0	(Note: Within TxBCN.)	–	1.1; 0	2.7
GESOP/The Adelaide Review	18–27 May 2023	2,216	55–57	15.3; 7/8	21.4; 10/11	21.0; 10/11	2.0; 0	20.4; 9/10	6.3; 3	4.5; 0	4.7; 0/2	2.0; 0		–	–	0.4
GAD3/RTVE–FORTA	12–27 May 2023	?	?	14.0; 6	21.0; 10	20.0; 9/10	2.0; 0	18.0; 8/9	9.0; 4	4.0; 0	7.0; 3	–		–	–	1.0
GESOP/The Adelaide Review	18–26 May 2023	1,644	56–58	13.5; 6/7	22.0; 10/11	20.5; 10	2.0; 0	21.5; 10/11	7.5; 3	3.0; 0	4.5; 0	2.0; 0		–	–	0.5
GESOP/The Adelaide Review	18–25 May 2023	1,644	55–57	13.0; 6/7	22.0; 10/11	21.1; 10	1.0; 0	22.0; 10/11	7.8; 3	2.9; 0	4.2; 0	1.7; 0		–	–	Tie
GESOP/The Adelaide Review	18–24 May 2023	1,435	55–57	13.0; 6/7	21.5; 10/11	21.5; 10/11	0.9; 0	22.0; 10/11	7.1; 3	3.0; 0	4.5; 0	2.0; 0		–	–	0.5
GESOP/The Adelaide Review	18–23 May 2023	1,052	57–59	13.0; 6/7	20.5; 10/11	22.0; 10/11	1.0; 0	22.0; 10/11	6.8; 3	3.5; 0	4.8; 0/2	1.4; 0		–	–	Tie
KeyData/Público	22 May 2023	?	64.5	14.1; 6/7	20.1; 9/10	20.8; 10	1.4; 0	20.3; 10	8.2; 4	4.0; 0	5.0; 0/2	–		–	–	0.5
NC Report/La Razón	22 May 2023	?	?	15.2; 8	17.2; 8	21.4; 11	–	19.4; 10	8.0; 4	–	–	–		–	–	2.0
GESOP/El Periódico	18–20 May 2023	755	?	13.0; 6/7	20.0; 10/11	21.9; 11/12	1.6; 0	21.3; 10/11	5.8; 2/3	4.2; 0	5.0; 0/2	3.4; 0		–	–	0.6
Target Point/El Debate	18 May 2023	?	65–66	13.6; 6	20.4; 9/10	21.7; 10/11	3.3; 0	18.9; 9	9.3; 4/5	3.4; 0	5.0; 0/2	1.8; 0		–	–	1.3
Feedback/El Nacional	15–18 May 2023	600	?	13.9; 6/7	20.5; 9/10	20.6; 9/10	3.0; 0	21.4; 10	6.3; 3	4.1; 0	5.0; 0/2	2.0; 0		–	–	0.8
Sigma Dos/El Mundo	15–18 May 2023	1,200	?	14.7; 6	20.8; 9/10	21.3; 10	2.6; 0	19.1; 9/10	8.5; 4	–	4.6; 0/1	–		–	–	0.5
Netquest/Ara	15–18 May 2023	1,006	?	13.0; 5/7	20.5; 9/11	18.0; 7/9	3.0; 0	18.0; 7/9	6.0; 0/3	7.0; 2/4	8.0; 3/4	–		–	–	2.5
40dB/Prisa	12–17 May 2023	800	?	14.2; 7	18.0; 9	21.9; 10	1.9; 0	19.5; 9	8.2; 4	4.3; 0	5.9; 2	–		–	–	2.4
Sigma Dos/Antena 3	14 May 2023	?	?	16.3; 8	21.5; 10/11	19.7; 9/10	? 0	19.3; 9/10	6.0; 3	? 0	3.1; 0	–		–	–	1.8
SocioMétrica/El Español	8–14 May 2023	?	?	14.8; 7/8	18.9; 9/10	21.3; 10/11	–	20.3; 9/11	8.4; 3/4	3.8; 0	4.5; 0/2	2.1; 0		–	–	1.0
Metroscopia	10–12 May 2023	1,000	68	14.0; 6/7	19.7; 9/10	22.0; 10/11	1.4; 0	19.8; 9/10	8.4; 3/4	4.4; 0	5.1; 0/2	2.5; 0		–	–	2.2
Data10/Okdiario	10–12 May 2023	1,500	?	14.3; 7	20.1; 9	20.8; 10	2.6; 0	19.8; 9	8.6; 4	2.7; 0	5.4; 2	1.3; 0		–	–	0.7
IMOP/El Confidencial	8–11 May 2023	809	?	15.4; 7/8	18.7; 9	20.8; 10	0.9; 0	24.1; 11/12	7.0; 3	–	3.8; 0	–		–	–	3.3
Ipsos/La Vanguardia	4–10 May 2023	1,000	54	11.1; 5	19.5; 9	22.0; 10	1.1; 0	21.6; 10	7.6; 3	4.0; 0	8.8; 4	2.4; 0		–	–	0.4
GAD3/ABC	6–9 May 2023	500	?	14.2; 7	19.7; 9	21.1; 10	2.3; 0	18.1; 8/9	9.7; 4	4.0; 0	6.0; 2/3	0.6; 0		–	–	1.4
Celeste-Tel/BET	2–7 May 2023	1,500	69.7	16.9; 8	17.6; 9	21.2; 10	–	17.2; 8	7.0; 3	–	–	–		–	6.5; 3	3.6
Ipsos	28 Apr–5 May 2023	1,004	?	10.4; 5	21.8; 10	19.8; 9	1.5; 0	21.4; 10	6.9; 3	4.6; 0	9.1; 4	2.1; 0		–	–	0.4
Netquest/Ara	24–27 Apr 2023	1,002	?	14.0; 5/8	18.5; 7/10	18.0; 7/10	5.5; 0/3	16.5; 6/9	8.0; 2/5	6.5; 0/4	7.5; 0/5	–		–	–	0.5
CIS	10–26 Apr 2023	1,609	?	13.2; 6/7	24.8; 11/13	22.5; 10/12	2.3; 0	17.3; 8/9	7.0; 2/3	3.6; 0	3.4; 0	2.1; 0		–	–	2.3
EM-Analytics/GMG	8 Mar–25 Apr 2023	800	?	15.9; 8	21.0; 10	21.4; 10	1.3; 0	21.2; 10	6.5; 3	4.7; 0	4.3; 0	3.4; 0		–	0.8; 0	0.2
NC Report/La Razón	24 Apr 2023	?	65.5	15.0; 8	16.3; 8	21.1; 11	–	19.6; 10	7.7; 4	–	–	–		–	–	1.5
GAD3/PP	18–20 Apr 2023	802	?	13.2; 6	17.4; 8/9	24.0; 12	3.3; 0	17.3; 8/9	11.1; 5	3.8; 0	4.9; 0/2	0.7; 0		–	0.5; 0	6.6
Data10/Okdiario	17–19 Apr 2023	1,500	?	14.8; 7	19.5; 10	20.3; 10	1.7; 0	20.6; 10	8.4; 4	4.6; 0	3.9; 0	1.9; 0		–	–	0.3
Netquest/ERC	7 Apr 2023	?	?	17.8; 9	18.5; 9	16.4; 8	4.2; 0	18.1; 9	6.8; 3	4.5; 0	7.4; 3	–	–	–	–	0.4
GESOP	20–28 Mar 2023	?	?	17.0; 8/9	19.0; 9/10	21.3; 10/11	–	19.9; 9/10	7.8; 3/4	–	–	–	–	–	–	1.4
Metroscopia	22 Mar 2023	850	?	14.4; 6/7	19.5; 9	21.8; 10/11	1.5; 0	19.7; 9	7.1; 3	5.7; 2	4.8; 0/2	2.2; 0	1.2; 0	–	–	2.1
Sigma Dos/El Mundo	3–9 Mar 2023	724	?	15.8; 7/8	19.2; 9	20.5; 9/10	2.8; 0	20.4; 9/10	8.4; 4	–	4.5; 0/2	–	–	–	–	0.1
EM-Analytics/GMG	13 Feb–7 Mar 2023	800	?	15.6; 7	20.7; 10	21.1; 10	1.5; 0	21.5; 11	6.3; 3	4.5; 0	4.4; 0	3.2; 0	–	–	1.0; 0	0.4
GAPS/JxCat	Mar 2023	802	?	15.0– 16.2; 7/8	17.7– 18.9; 9/10	16.9– 18.1; 8/9	1.7– 2.9; 0	26.4– 27.6; 13/14	4.0– 5.2; 0/2	2.0– 3.2; 0	4.2– 5.4; 0/2	–	–	–	–	8.7
Target Point	23–28 Feb 2023	1,204	?	15.6; 7/8	18.3; 9/10	19.4; 9/10	3.2; 0	19.1; 9/10	8.4; 3/4	4.2; 0/2	3.7; 0	2.8; 0	1.3; 0	–	–	0.3
KeyData/Público	16 Feb 2023	?	64.9	15.1; 7	18.2; 9	20.6; 10	3.1; 0	21.2; 10	6.6; 3	5.3; 2	4.5; 0	–	–	–	–	0.6
EM-Analytics/GMG	19 Jan–12 Feb 2023	800	?	15.7; 8	20.6; 10	21.7; 11	2.5; 0	20.3; 10	5.4; 2	4.2; 0	4.3; 0	3.3; 0	–	–	1.0; 0	1.1
Ipsos/BComú	6–10 Feb 2023	1,000	?	11.5; 5	22.5; 10	19.7; 9	1.2; 0	23.5; 11	7.5; 3	4.4; 0	6.3; 3	1.0; 0	–	–	–	1.0
Feedback/El Nacional	23–26 Jan 2023	600	?	16.0; 7/8	16.7; 8/9	19.3; 9/10	3.4; 0	23.1; 11/12	5.2; 2	4.7; 0/2	4.7; 0/2	2.4; 0	–	–	–	3.8
GESOP/El Periódico	23–25 Jan 2023	801	?	15.8; 8	17.8; 9	20.7; 10	2.9; 0	22.0; 11	7.3; 3	3.6; 0	4.0; 0	1.0; 0	–	–	–	1.3
Celeste-Tel/BET	10–25 Jan 2023	1,500	67.5	16.0; 8	17.9; 9	19.8; 9	3.0; 0	20.0; 10	7.0; 3	4.4; 0	3.6; 0	–	–	–	5.1; 2	0.2
Ipsos/La Vanguardia	9–11 Jan 2023	500	69.0	10.4; 5	22.2; 10	21.7; 10	1.9; 0	24.9; 12	5.9; 2	5.1; 2	3.9; 0	1.2; 0	–	–	–	2.7
EM-Analytics/GMG	16 Dec–5 Jan 2023	663	?	22.3; 12	22.4; 12	21.7; 12	3.3; 0	10.5; 5	4.5; 0	4.5; 0	3.1; 0	3.1; 0	–	2.9; 0	1.0; 0	0.1
Netquest/Ara	28 Dec–2 Jan 2023	1,002	?	16.0; 6/9	16.3; 6/9	19.8; 7/11	4.9; 0/3	16.3; 6/9	8.0; 2/5	7.6; 0/5	5.3; 0/3	–	–	–	–	3.5
GESOP/PSC	27 Dec 2022	?	?	? 8	? 8	? 10	? 0	? 8	? 3	? 2	? 2	–	–	–	–	?
EM-Analytics/GMG	23 Nov–14 Dec 2022	663	?	22.3; 12	22.2; 12	21.7; 12	3.6; 0	9.8; 5	4.7; 0	4.3; 0	3.2; 0	3.2; 0	–	3.1; 0	1.0; 0	0.1
Metroscopia	24 Nov 2022	800	?	16.2; 7/8	17.4; 8/9	24.3; 11/12	–	16.5; 7/8	6.0; 2/3	6.3; 2/3	5.7; 2/3	–	–	–	–	6.9
EM-Analytics/GMG	23 Oct–22 Nov 2022	714	?	22.4; 12	22.0; 12	21.8; 12	3.8; 0	9.1; 5	4.8; 0	4.6; 0	3.2; 0	3.2; 0	–	2.9; 0	1.3; 0	0.4
EM-Analytics/GMG	19 Sep–22 Oct 2022	603	?	22.6; 12	21.9; 12	21.5; 11	4.0; 0	9.1; 4	5.3; 2	4.4; 0	3.3; 0	3.1; 0	0.8; 0	3.6; 0	–	0.7
Opinòmetre/Foment	26–30 Sep 2022	1,000	?	? 10/11	? 9/10	? 11/12	? 0	? 8/9	? 2/3	? 0	? 0	–	–	–	–	?
EM-Analytics/GMG	15 Aug–18 Sep 2022	484	?	23.8; 13	20.6; 11	20.4; 11	4.8; 0	9.0; 4	5.1; 2	4.3; 0	3.3; 0	3.1; 0	0.8; 0	3.9; 0	–	3.2
GAPS/JxCat	2–10 Sep 2022	803	?	17.1– 18.3; 8/10	18.7– 19.9; 9/10	17.7– 18.9; 8/10	–	21.9– 23.1; 10/12	5.3– 6.3; 2/3	–	3.8– 5.0; 0/2	–	–	–	–	3.2
EM-Analytics/GMG	13 Jul–14 Aug 2022	483	?	23.6; 13	19.9; 10	20.3; 11	4.7; 0	10.2; 5	5.0; 2	4.3; 0	3.3; 0	3.2; 0	0.8; 0	4.2; 0	–	3.3
EM-Analytics/GMG	15 Jun–12 Jul 2022	654	?	23.5; 12	20.5; 10	20.2; 10	5.1; 2	10.1; 5	5.3; 2	4.1; 0	3.2; 0	3.2; 0	0.8; 0	3.8; 0	–	3.0
EM-Analytics/GMG	20 May–15 Jun 2022	732	?	23.3; 12	20.1; 11	21.0; 11	5.3; 2	10.1; 5	4.7; 0	3.6; 0	3.1; 0	2.8; 0	0.8; 0	4.7; 0	–	2.3
GESOP/El Periódico	26 May–3 Jun 2022	805	?	22.0– 23.0; 11/12	16.0– 17.0; 7/8	22.5– 23.5; 11/12	4.0– 5.0; 0/2	9.0– 10.0; 4/5	6.5– 7.5; 3	4.5– 5.5; 0/2	5.0– 6.0; 2	–	–	–	–	0.5
Feedback/El Nacional	10–19 May 2022	500	66.8	22.2; 10/11	18.0; 8	19.9; 9	7.8; 3	10.6; 4/5	4.8; 0/2	5.1; 0/2	7.1; 3	–	–	–	–	2.3
EM-Analytics/GMG	2–18 May 2022	1,374	?	23.5; 13	19.1; 10	21.4; 11	5.4; 2	9.7; 5	4.9; 0	3.3; 0	2.5; 0	2.3; 0	0.7; 0	4.7; 0	–	2.1
2021 regional election	14 Feb 2021	—N/a	57.1	19.1 (8)	9.2 (4)	23.6 (11)	6.2 (2)	17.9 (8)	5.3 (2)	6.9 (3)	7.1 (3)	–	–	–	–	4.5
Opinòmetre/City Council (PSC) (Note: Alternative projection based on raw local barometer data.)	25 Nov–3 Dec 2020	799	?	20.0; 10/11	19.7; 10	19.2; 10	5.5; 2	9.1; 4	5.7; 2/3	5.6; 2/3	1.3; 0	4.1; 0	–	–	–	0.3
November 2019 general election	10 Nov 2019	—N/a	73.4	21.0 (9)	15.6 (7)	19.9 (9)	5.7 (2)	12.4 (5)	9.5 (4)	7.0 (3)	5.3 (2)	–	–	–	–	1.1
2019 municipal election	26 May 2019	—N/a	66.2	21.4; 10	20.7; 10	18.4; 8	13.2; 6	10.5; 5	5.0; 2	3.9; 0	1.2; 0	(Note: Within Cs.)	–	–	–	0.7

=== Voting preferences ===
The table below lists raw, unweighted voting preferences.

Polling firm/Commissioner	Fieldwork date	Sample size	ERC	BComú	PSC	CS	JxCat	PP	CUP	Vox	Valents	Question	X mark	Lead
2023 municipal election	28 May 2023	—N/a	6.7	11.9	11.9	0.7	13.5	5.5	2.3	3.4	1.4	—N/a	39.4	1.6
GESOP/El Periódico	18–20 May 2023	755	7.7	17.4	13.9	0.3	13.7	2.6	2.9	2.4	1.1	27.8	5.2	3.5
40dB/Prisa	12–17 May 2023	800	11.2	10.7	15.0	2.0	14.5	7.0	4.5	6.3	2.2	14.8	6.4	0.5
CIS	10–26 Apr 2023	1,609	7.6	20.0	13.8	0.9	11.7	4.4	2.2	2.9	1.2	28.0	3.5	6.2
GESOP/El Periódico	23–25 Jan 2023	801	10.4	16.1	12.1	0.4	15.0	3.2	2.2	1.6	0.4	29.9	5.0	1.1
Opinòmetre/Foment	26–30 Sep 2022	1,000	10.1	9.5	10.8	2.7	8.1	4.4	2.1	1.2	–	35.8	8.3	0.7
GESOP/El Periódico	26 May–3 Jun 2022	805	14.7	11.6	13.4	1.9	4.2	3.2	4.7	2.7	–	27.4	10.8	1.3
Opinòmetre/City Council	24–31 May 2022	809	10.9	11.9	7.5	0.8	3.4	1.7	2.9	1.1	–	45.5	11.9	1.0
Opinòmetre/City Council	22 Nov–1 Dec 2021	802	10.2	14.8	7.4	1.0	3.6	1.8	2.6	1.2	0.1	43.5	10.0	4.6
Opinòmetre/City Council	2–10 Jun 2021	808	13.8	12.3	9.6	1.1	7.2	2.5	4.2	1.1	0.1	31.6	13.8	1.5
2021 regional election (Note: Does not include non-resident citizens.)	14 Feb 2021	—N/a	10.6	5.1	13.0	3.4	9.9	2.9	3.8	4.0	–	—N/a	42.9	2.4
Opinòmetre/City Council	25 Nov–3 Dec 2020	799	12.0	12.2	8.3	2.2	3.5	1.4	3.6	0.8	–	44.8	8.3	0.2
Opinòmetre/City Council	3–13 Jul 2020	805	13.1	13.9	9.3	1.1	4.2	0.6	3.1	–	0.1	39.0	12.0	0.8
ODEC/City Council	26 Nov–5 Dec 2019	831	16.0	15.5	8.9	2.6	4.7	1.5	4.7	0.6	0.4	34.1	9.1	0.5
November 2019 general election	10 Nov 2019	—N/a	15.3	11.4	14.6	4.1	9.1	6.9	5.1	3.9	–	—N/a	27.3	0.7
2019 municipal election	26 May 2019	—N/a	14.1	13.7	12.1	8.7	6.9	3.3	2.6	0.8		—N/a	33.8	0.4

=== Preferred Mayor ===
The table below lists opinion polling on leader preferences to become mayor of Barcelona.

Color key:

Poll conducted after legal ban on opinion polls

Polling firm/Commissioner	Fieldwork date	Sample size										Other/ None/ Not care	Question	Lead
Polling firm/Commissioner	Fieldwork date	Sample size	Maragall ERC	Colau BComú–C	Collboni PSC	Grau CS	Trias JxCat	Sirera PP	Changuerra CUP	De Oro Vox	Parera Valents	Other/ None/ Not care	Question	Lead
GESOP/The Adelaide Review	18–27 May 2023	2,216	13.0	23.2	13.5	2.3	18.1	2.0	3.0	1.7	2.0	10.5	10.6	5.1
GESOP/The Adelaide Review	18–26 May 2023	1,644	13.5	23.9	13.9	1.7	17.3	2.6	2.8	1.0	1.6	9.2	12.6	6.6
GESOP/The Adelaide Review	18–25 May 2023	1,644	14.0	22.7	14.2	1.6	16.6	2.4	1.9	1.2	2.0	9.7	13.9	6.1
GESOP/The Adelaide Review	18–24 May 2023	1,435	13.0	22.8	15.0	0.7	18.5	2.2	1.9	1.2	1.9	8.6	14.1	4.3
GESOP/The Adelaide Review	18–23 May 2023	1,052	12.0	23.4	14.0	0.8	20.3	2.1	2.2	1.2	2.1	7.4	14.5	3.1
GESOP/El Periódico	18–20 May 2023	755	11.0	23.3	13.8	0.9	21.2	2.4	2.5	1.2	1.8	7.3	14.6	2.1
40dB/Prisa	12–17 May 2023	800	12.9	13.3	14.5	2.8	17.1	6.1	4.2	6.7	2.8	9.7	10.0	2.6
IMOP/El Confidencial	8–11 May 2023	809	12.0	18.0	8.0	–	21.0	–	–	–	–	–	–	3.0
Ipsos/La Vanguardia	4–10 May 2023	1,000	8.0	15.0	8.0	2.0	22.0	2.0	–	1.0	2.0	40.0		7.0
Ipsos	28 Apr–5 May 2023	1,004	9.9	19.4	12.2	–	19.9	–	–	–	–	–	–	0.5
Ipsos/BComú	6–10 Feb 2023	1,000	10.0	21.0	9.0	–	21.0	–	–	–	–	–	–	Tie
Feedback/El Nacional	23–26 Jan 2023	600	13.1	14.0	15.5	–	43.3	–	–	–	–	7.1	7.0	27.8
GESOP/El Periódico	23–25 Jan 2023	801	11.1	19.7	8.5	0.7	23.5	0.9	0.5	0.5	0.6	13.4	20.6	3.8
GAPS/JxCat	2–10 Sep 2022	803	9.7	14.7	9.0	–	22.3	–	–	–	–	44.3		7.6

== Results ==
← Summary of the 28 May 2023 City Council of Barcelona election results →
Parties and alliances	Popular vote			Seats	
Parties and alliances	Votes	%	±pp	Total	+/−
Trias for Barcelona–Municipal Commitment (TriasxBCN–CM)^{1}	149,479	22.45	+11.94	11	+6
PSC–Good for Barcelona–United–Progress Candidacy (PSC–CP)	131,923	19.82	+1.41	10	+2
Barcelona in Common–Confluence (BComú–C)	131,581	19.76	−0.98	9	−1
Republican Left of Catalonia–Municipal Agreement (ERC–AM)	74,804	11.24	−10.13	5	−5
People's Party (PP)	61,362	9.22	+4.21	4	+2
Vox (Vox)	37,990	5.71	+4.55	2	+2
CUP–The Alternative–Municipalist Alternative (CUP–L'A–AMunt)	25,213	3.79	−0.10	0	±0
Brave (Valents)^{2}	15,407	2.31	n/a	0	−3
Citizens–Party of the Citizenry (CS)^{2}	7,234	1.09	n/a	0	−3
Barcelona is you (BCN ets tú)	7,196	1.08	+1.08	0	±0
Animalist Party with the Environment (PACMA)^{3}	7,151	1.07	+0.25	0	±0
The Greens–Green Alternative (EV–AV)	2,258	0.34	New	0	±0
Blank Seats (EB)	1,703	0.26	+0.20	0	±0
New Politics Primaries (NovaPrimàries)^{4}	1,421	0.21	−3.53	0	±0
Cannabis Party–Green Light (PC–LV)	933	0.14	New	0	±0
National Front of Catalonia (FNC)	923	0.14	New	0	±0
Communist Party of the Workers of Catalonia (PCTC)	730	0.11	New	0	±0
Alliance of the Spanish Republican Left (AIREs–La Izquierda)	368	0.06	New	0	±0
Humanist Party (PH)	313	0.05	New	0	±0
Family and Life Party (PFyV)	296	0.04	+0.01	0	±0
United for the International Solidarity (Unidos SI)	229	0.03	−0.04	0	±0
We Are Identitaries (SOMI)	200	0.03	New	0	±0
Justice and Union (JES–UEP)	153	0.02	New	0	±0
Party of Labour–Effective Democracy–Valencian Republic (PTDCERV)	91	0.01	New	0	±0
Blank ballots	6,788	1.02	+0.67		
Total	665,746			41	±0
Valid votes	665,746	99.06	−0.74		
Invalid votes	6,307	0.94	+0.74		
Votes cast / turnout	672,053	60.59	−5.58		
Abstentions	437,063	39.41	+5.58		
Registered voters	1,109,116				
Sources
Footnotes: ^{1} Trias for Barcelona–Municipal Commitment results are compared to Together totals in the 2019 election.; ^{2} Within the Barcelona for Change–Citizens alliance in the 2019 election.; ^{3} Animalist Party with the Environment results are compared to Animalist Party Against Mistreatment of Animals totals in the 2019 election.; ^{4} New Politics Primaries results are compared to Barcelona is Capital–Primaries totals in the 2019 election.

Popular vote
TriasxBCN–CM	22.45%
PSC–CP	19.82%
BComú–C	19.76%
ERC–AM	11.24%
PP	9.22%
Vox	5.71%
CUP–L'A–AMunt	3.79%
Valents	2.31%
CS	1.09%
BCN ets tú	1.08%
PACMA	1.07%
Others	1.44%
Blank ballots	1.02%

Seats
TriasxBCN–CM	26.83%
PSC–CP	24.39%
BComú–C	21.95%
ERC–AM	12.20%
PP	9.76%
Vox	4.88%

== Aftermath ==
=== Government formation ===
At the first meeting of the council on 17 June 2023, Jaume Collboni of the PSC was elected as the new mayor of Barcelona after receiving the support of his own party, Barcelona en Comú and the PP for a total of 23 votes, above the threshold of 21 votes required for the mayorality not to be automatically assumed by Xavier Trias as the leader of the most-voted candidature.

Investiture
Ballot →	17 June 2023	
Required majority →	21 out of 41	
Jaume Collboni (PSC): • PSC (10); • BComú (9); • PP (4)	23 / 41	check
Xavier Trias (Junts): • Junts (11); • ERC (5)	16 / 41	X mark
Gonzalo de Oro (Vox): • Vox (2)	2 / 41	X mark
Abstentions/Blank ballots	0 / 41	
Absentees	0 / 41	

== Bibliography ==
- Constitución Española (Constitution). Official State Gazette (in Spanish). 27 December 1978 [version as of 27 September 2011]. BOE-A-1978-31229.
- Ley 7/1985, de 2 de abril, Reguladora de las Bases del Régimen Local (Law 7/1985). Official State Gazette (in Spanish). 2 April 1985 [version as of 29 December 2021]. BOE-A-1985-5392.
- Ley Orgánica 5/1985, de 19 de junio, del Régimen Electoral General (Organic Law 5/1985). Official State Gazette (in Spanish). 19 June 1985 [version as of 3 October 2022]. BOE-A-1985-11672.
- Real Decreto 207/2023, de 3 de abril, por el que se convocan elecciones locales y a las Asambleas de Ceuta y Melilla para el 28 de mayo de 2023 (Royal Decree 207/2023). Official State Gazette (in Spanish). 3 April 2023. BOE-A-2023-8458.
