= Marta Reina Izquiano =

Spanish LGBT rights activist and Chinese traditional medicine specialist (born 1970)

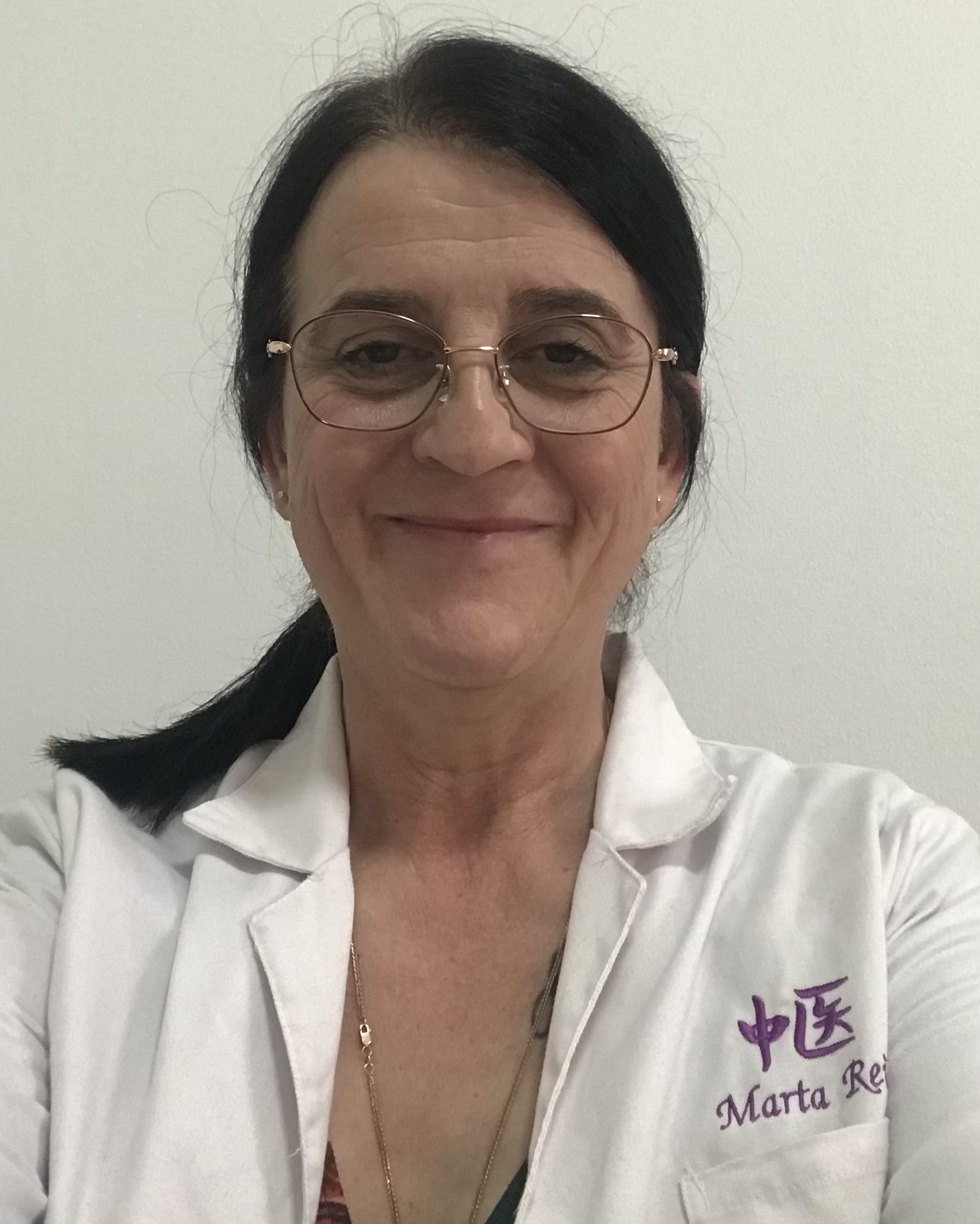
- Born: November 10, 1970 (age 55); Badalona, Spain
- Citizenship: Spanish
- Occupations: LGBTI activist, mosso d’esquadra and practitioner of traditional Chinese medicine.
- Website: https://www.martareina.com/

Signature
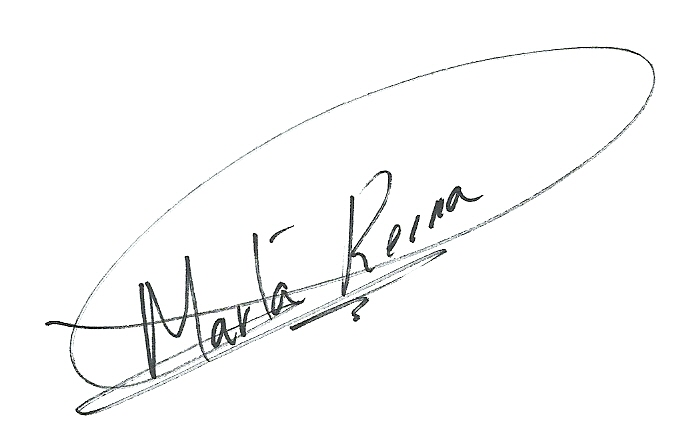

Marta Reina Izquiano (born November 10, 1970) is a Spanish LGBTI rights activist and specialist in traditional Chinese medicine.

== Biography ==
She is an expert in the field of document analysis and falsification, in 2016 she was the first transgender Mosso d'Esquadra in Catalonia. She was part of the Mossos d'Esquadra until 2023. Part of her LGBTI activism has revolved around vaginoplasty and the ambiguous technique in Spain.

From 2014 to 2020 she was with Podemos and Más País. In 2017 she was responsible for LGBTI policies of the party.

In 2018, she ran in the Catalan primaries with the Contigo si se puede (With you it is possible) candidacy and also in the Barcelona municipal elections with the Por el derecho a la ciudad (For the right to the city) candidacy. She also ran as a candidate in the April 2019 general elections to the Congress of Deputies and the Senate for Catalonia.

She read the manifesto Personas trans, tan común es como diversxs (Trans People, As Common As Diverse) at the Barcelona Gay Pride Parade in 2016. On October 28, 2019, she underwent gender reassignment surgery at the Bellvitge University Hospital.

She has been living in China since 2023, specializing in traditional Chinese medicine and has written the autobiographical book Viviendo sin tí (Living Without You).
