= Afroféminas =

Organization

- Founded: 2014; 12 years ago
- Headquarters: Spain
- Director: Antoinette Torres Soler
- Website: afrofeminas.com

Afroféminas is an online community and political organization created in 2014 to give a voice to and make Black women visible in Spain. Its objective is to be a digital medium where Black women can discuss literature, opinions, poetry, and journalism to establish a dialogue from the perspectives of racialized women. The organization's founder and current director is Antoinette Torres Soler, a social researcher of Cuban origin. The organization has also been presided over by Basha Changue, currently a deputy to the Parliament of Catalonia.

The Afroféminas group promotes the diffusion of experiences, voices, and knowledge of Black women and others who contribute with themes of collective interest. They also provide workshops where they confide their experiences with white women. Along with, they have led activism campaigns to change post-colonial mindsets in Spanish society and traditions. An example of this was their public stance against the pages of the Cavalcade of Magi celebrations in Alcoy being made up of white people using Blackface.

One of their other projects is the creation of a physical space in the Casa de la Mujer de Zaragoza where they promote and make visible Black feminism, which is seldom recognized inside Spanish society.

They are part of a Black feminist front, which combats the double exclusion of Black women due to being women and being racialized as Black. For this reason, they defend the decolonial mindset as a starting point to defend women's rights. One of their missions is to defend human rights and a reteaching of the form of colonialism represented as a hegemonic position in popular culture and in literature.

== See also ==
- Artemisa Semedo
- Zinthia Álvarez Palomino
