= Basha Changue =

Catalan politician (born 1984)

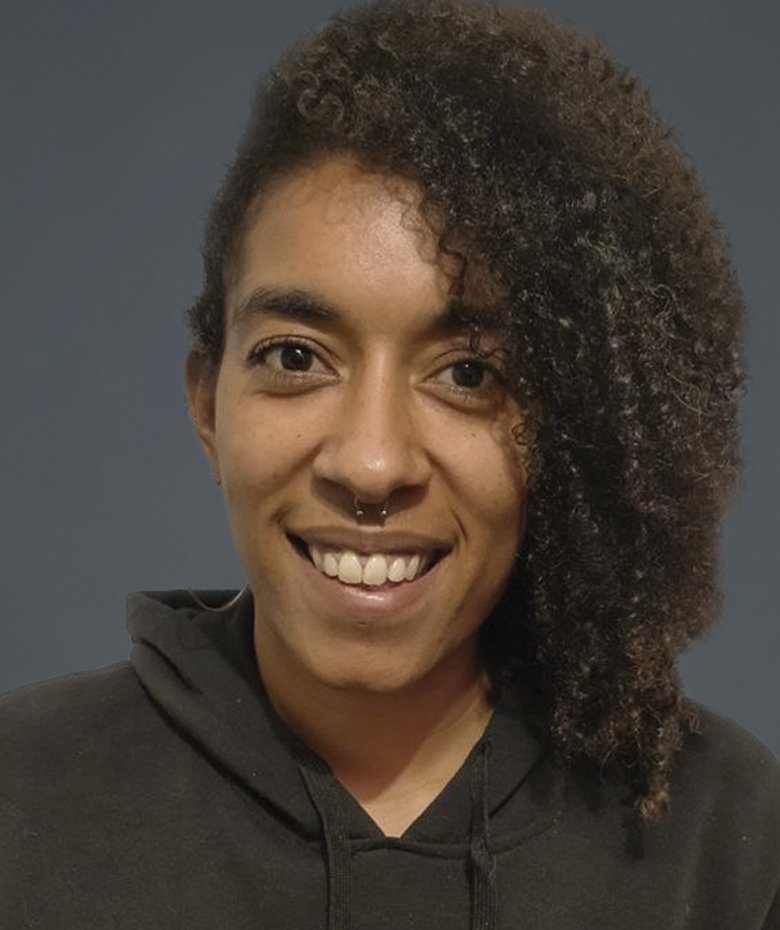
- Changue in 2021

Member of the Parliament of Catalonia
- In office 12 March 2021 – 19 March 2024
- Constituency: Barcelona

Councillor of Moià City Council
- In office 15 June 2019 – 2021

Personal details
- Born: Basharat Changue i Canalejo; 1984 (age 41–42) Nou Barris, Barcelona, Catalonia, Spain
- Citizenship: Spanish
- Party: Popular Unity Candidacy
- Occupation: Politician

Basharat Changue i Canalejo (born 1984), better known as Basha Changue and informally as Basha Changuerra, is a Catalan activist and politician who served as a deputy in the Parliament of Catalonia from 2021 to 2024.

== Biography ==
Basharat Changue i Canalejo was born in 1984, in the Nou Barris district of Barcelona. The daughter of an Equatoguinean father and an Andalusian mother, she studied interior design and social integration. As an anti-racist and Afro-feminist activist, she is the promoter of the AfroFem Koop cooperative and a member of the Comunitat Negra Africana i Afrodescendent a Catalunya group. She presided over the Afroféminas political organization. She also collaborates in various media and has been councillor for the Popular Unity Candidacy (CUP) in Moià City Council.

Ahead of the elections to the Parliament of Catalonia in 2021, she ranked 5th on the CUP-Guanyem list for the constituency of Barcelona and was elected as a member of the 13th Parliament of Catalonia.

On 18 September 2022, she was chosen to head the broad list, of which the CUP is part, for the 2023 Barcelona City Council election. She lost.
