= Zinthia Álvarez Palomino =

- Born: 1986 (age 39–40); Maracaibo, Venezuela
- Occupations: Journalist, writer, activist

Zinthia Álvarez Palomino (born 1988) is a Venezuelan-Spanish journalist, writer, and investigative activist, having graduated with specific studies in international migration. She is a resident of A Coruña, Spain. She is featured in the educational project Mujeres negras que cambiaron el mundo.

== Biography ==
Álvarez Palomino was born in 1988 in Maracaibo, Venezuela. She became a journalist and social integration specialist in intercultural mediation and community dynamization with a specialization in international migration.

She was one of the founders of Afrogalegas, a collective that seeks to affirm the visibility and recognition of African and Afro-descendant women. Along with, as a human rights activist for Black people, she has participated in various national and international congresses. She formed part of the VIII Encuentro Cultura y Ciudadanía promoted by Spanish Ministry of Culture.

As a journalist, she has collaborated with organizations such as Pikara Magazine and Afroféminas, covering themes related to gender, ethnic-racial diversity, and migration.

In 2019, Álvarez Palomino published the book Mujeres negras en la ciencia, illustrated by Nina Sefcik. This book, geared towards children, seeks to give visibility to the cobtributions made by Black and Afro-descendent women in history. The book was translated into Catalan by Editorial Wanafrica.

Álvarez Palomino was the main driver behind the educational project Mujeres negras que cambiaron el mundo, which seeks to create respectful representation of African and Afro-descendent women through literature and the hosting activities such as workshops and chats.

== Works ==
Mujeres negras en la ciencia, 2019. Children's book that recognizes 12 women that are known for their scientific and technological work in many fields.

Mujeres negras en la filosofía, 2024. Children's book that recognizes 12 women that greatly achieved in the fields of history, philosophy, and anthropology.

Yo, mujer migrante, 2024. A collective book that recognizes the stories and testimonies of migrant women who reside in Spain.

== Recognitions ==
In 2019, Domus organized an exposition based on Álvarez Palomino's book Mujeres negras en la ciencia.

== See also ==
- Desirée Bela-Lobedde
- Artemisa Semedo
