= Elsa Artadi =

Spanish economist and politician

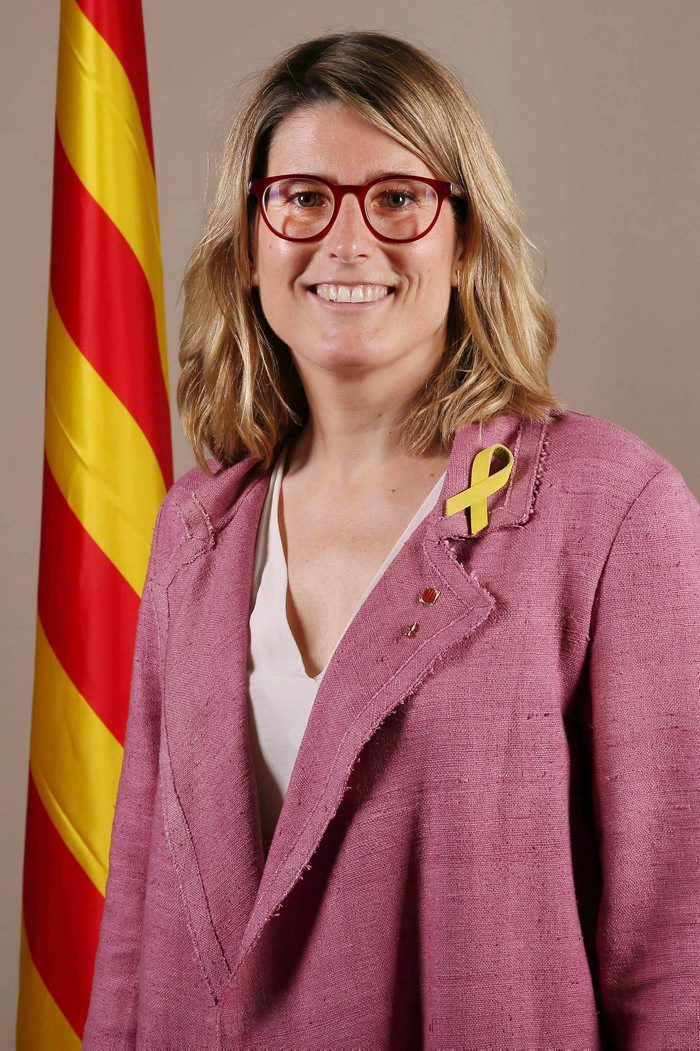
- Artadi in July 2018

Minister of the Presidency of Catalonia
- In office 2 June 2018 – 24 March 2019
- President: Quim Torra
- Preceded by: Jordi Turull
- Succeeded by: Meritxell Budó (Direct rule until 2 June 2018)

Government Spokesperson of Catalonia
- In office 2 June 2018 – 24 March 2019
- President: Quim Torra
- Preceded by: Jordi Turull
- Succeeded by: Meritxell Budó (Direct rule until 2 June 2018)

Member of the Parliament of Catalonia
- In office 17 January 2018 – 10 May 2022
- Constituency: Barcelona

Member of the Barcelona City Council
- In office 15 June 2019 – 27 May 2022
- Succeeded by: Joan Rodríguez

Personal details
- Born: Elsa Vila i Artadi; 19 August 1976 (age 50) Barcelona, Catalonia, Spain
- Citizenship: Spanish
- Party: Together for Catalonia
- Education: Pompeu Fabra University; Harvard University
- Occupation: Economist, academic

Elsa Artadi i Vila (born 19 August 1976) is a Catalan economist, academic and politician from Catalonia. Artadi is a member of the Parliament of Catalonia and was previously Minister of the Presidency and Government Spokesperson of Catalonia.

Born in 1976 in Barcelona, Artadi studied economics at Pompeu Fabra University and Harvard University before becoming an academic. She taught economics at Bocconi University and was visiting professor at several other universities. Later she held various senior positions at the Generalitat de Catalunya.

Artadi was elected to the Parliament of Catalonia at the 2017 regional election as an independent candidate for the pro-independence Together for Catalonia electoral alliance. She was Minister of the Presidency and Government Spokesman between June 2018 and March 2019.

== Early life ==
Artadi was born on 19 August 1976 in Barcelona, Catalonia, Spain. Her mother Esther Artadi manages a small estate agent. Her parents separated when she was young and Elsa and her brother Patrick have chosen to use their mother's surname, Artadi, first rather than their father's surname, Vila.

Artadi studied at an independent school in Barcelona. After school Artadi joined the Pompeu Fabra University (UPF) in 1994, graduating in 1998 with a degree in economics. She received a Master's degree from UPF in 2000. She joined Harvard University in 2000 on a scholarship from Fundació "la Caixa", receiving a master's degree (2002) and a doctorate (2006) in economics from the university.

== Career ==
Artadi taught economics at the Bocconi University in Milan between 2006 and 2010. During this period she was also a visiting professor at Fudan University in Shanghai (2007), UPF (2009–10) and Barcelona Graduate School of Economics (2009–11). She was also a member of the World Bank's scientific committee in Casablanca (2008), a consultant to the World Bank in Washington, D.C. (2009) and a member of the European Economic Association's scientific committee (2009–10).

Artadi joined the Generalitat de Catalunya, Catalonia's regional government, in 2011 as an economic advisor to Andreu Mas-Colell, the Minister of Economy and Finance. In 2013 she became managing director of the generalitat's Entitat Autònoma de Jocs i Apostes, serving until 2015. She was also Director General of Tax and Game during this time. She was promoted to Finance Secretary in 2015 and in early 2016 she became Director-General of Inter-departmental Coordination.

Artadi became a member of the Catalan nationalist Catalan European Democratic Party (PDeCAT) in the summer of 2016. She became a member of the PDeCAT's executive, taking responsibility for studies and programs, but later left the party due to differences.

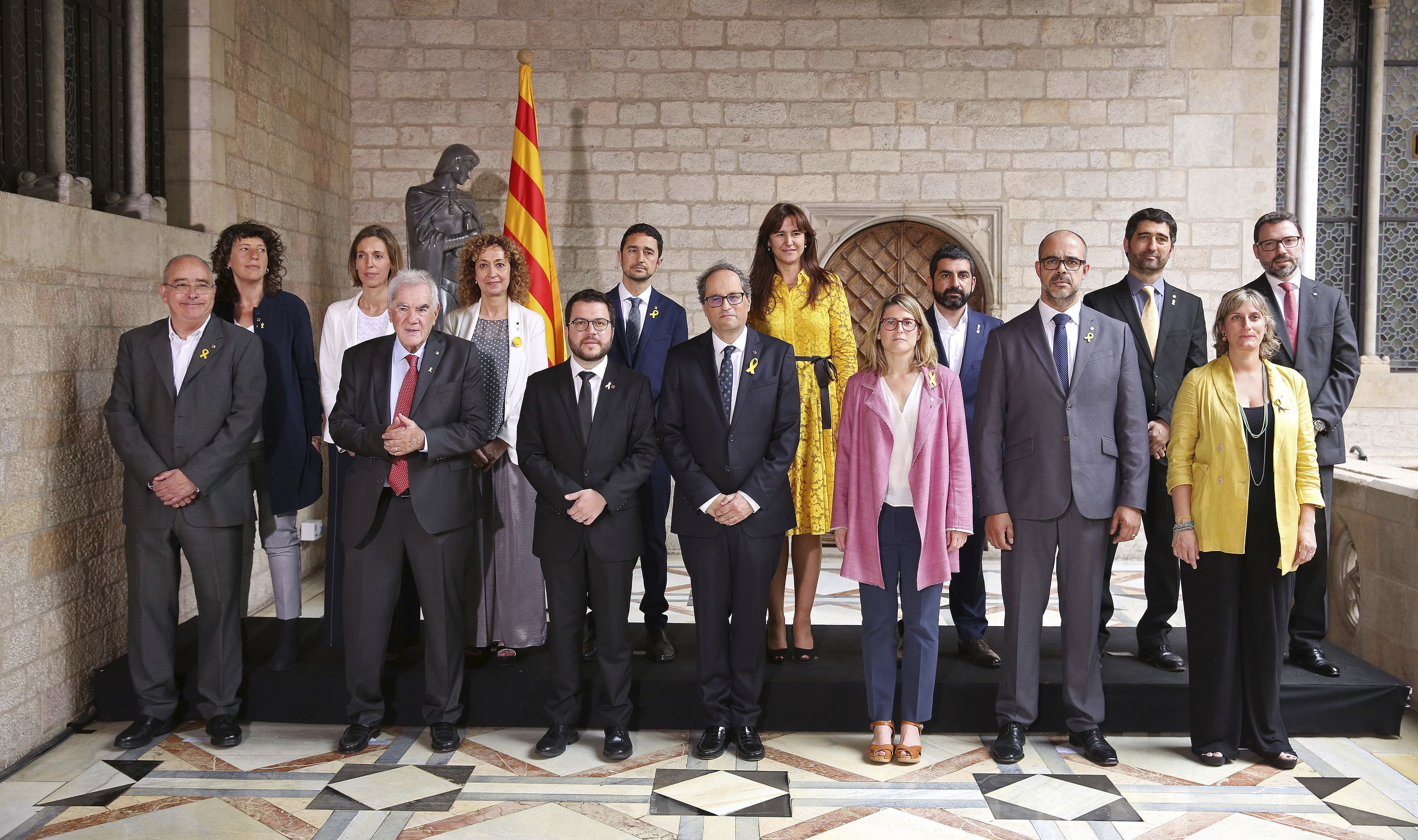
Artadi and other members of the Catalan government on 2 June 2018

Artadi contested the 2017 regional election as an independent Together for Catalonia (JuntsxCat) electoral alliance candidate in the Province of Barcelona and was elected to the Parliament of Catalonia. At the election Catalan secessionists retained a slim majority in the Catalan Parliament. Artadi was spokesperson for the JuntsxCat parliamentary group. On 19 May 2018 newly elected President Quim Torra nominated a new government in which Artadi was to be Minister of Enterprise and Knowledge and Government Spokesperson. However, the Spanish government condemned the inclusion of jailed/exiled politicians in the government as provocative and refused to approve Torra's appointments or to revoke direct rule. Faced with this opposition Torra announced a new government on 29 May 2018 without the jailed/exiled politicians. Artadi was to be Minister of the Presidency and Government Spokesperson in the new government. She was sworn in on 2 June 2018 at the Palau de la Generalitat de Catalunya. She resigned in March 2019 to contest the 2019 local elections as the JuntsxCat's number two candidate in Barcelona.

In July 2020 Artadi joined the newly formed Together for Catalonia political party.

== Personal life ==
Artadi was married to architect Alberto Arraut. She is a yoga enthusiast and enjoys running and water colour painting.

== Electoral history ==
Electoral history of Elsa Artadi
Election	Constituency	Party	Alliance	No.	Result
2017 regional	Province of Barcelona	Independent	Together for Catalonia	10	Elected
