= Gonzalo de Oro =

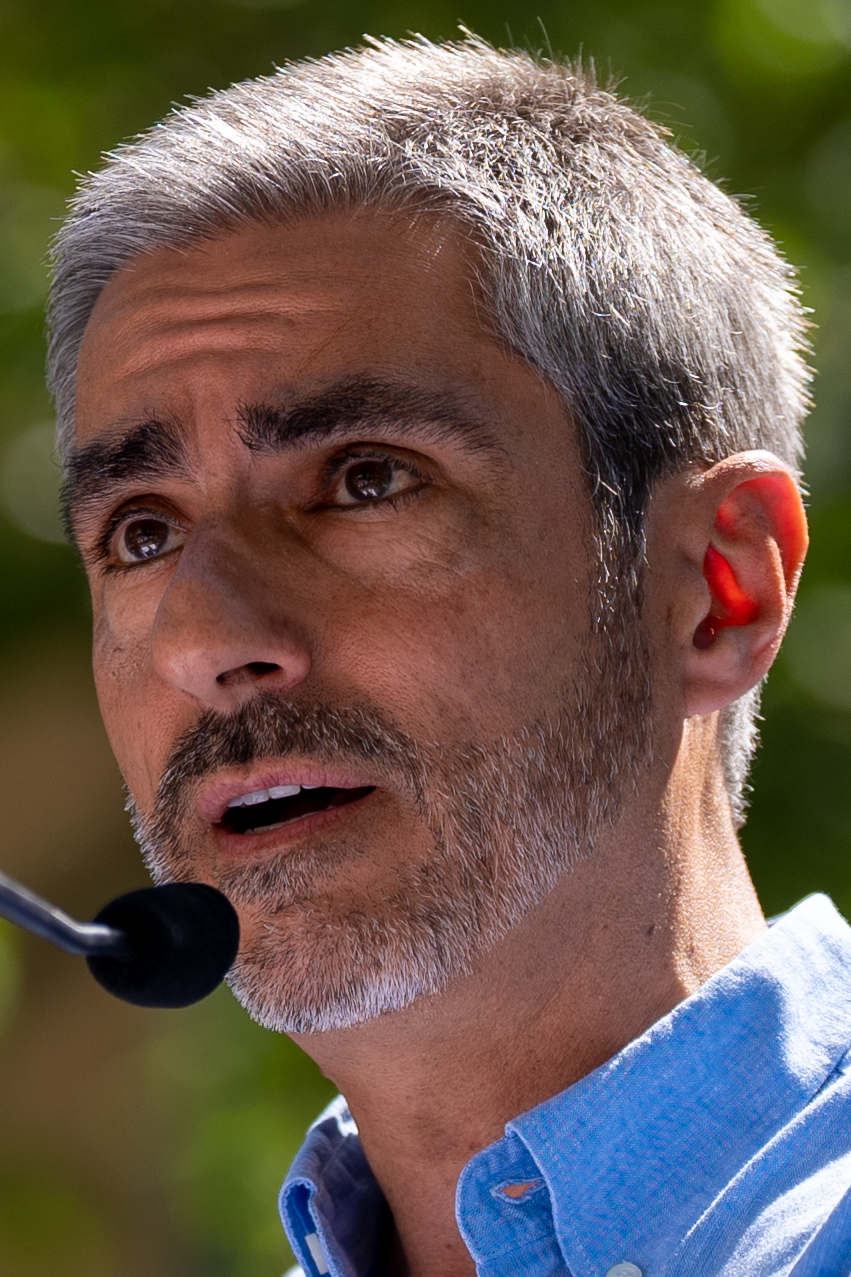

Gonzalo de Oro-Pulido Plaza (born 1970) is a Spanish politician of the party Vox. He was elected to the City Council of Barcelona in 2023.

== Biography ==
De Oro has two children, and lives in Sarrià-Sant Gervasi as of 2023. Since 2012, he is a partner and director of Rhombus Global Consulting, a global wealth management consultancy. As of 2022, he had over 25 years of experience in banking, including employment at Banco Sabadell and Liberbank.

De Oro joined Vox in 2018 and was made their coordinator in Barcelona in 2021. In December 2022, he was named their candidate for mayor in the 2023 Barcelona City Council election. In his campaign, he said he would remove communism and Catalan separatism from the city, as well as dealing with squatting and insecurity, issues that he blamed on incumbent Ada Colau. During the campaign, his son was arrested at a protest against a squat, for possession of an extendable baton. De Oro said "it isn't good, but it's understandable", claiming that residents required arms for self-defence. He referred to Barcelona as the "European Mecca of illegal immigration and delinquency" and called its mayor a "dangerous psychopathic communist". His party received 37,000 votes and two seats on Barcelona City Council.

De Oro was the richest member of the council elected in 2023, with €800,000 in his bank accounts. He owned four apartments in Barcelona outright, and had shares in other properties and businesses.
