= 2019 Barcelona municipal election =

Election in the Spanish municipality of Barcelona

- 26 May 2019

All 41 seats in the City Council of Barcelona 21 seats needed for a majority
- Opinion polls
- Registered: 1,142,444 ▼1.6%
- Turnout: 755,983 (66.2%) ▲5.6 pp
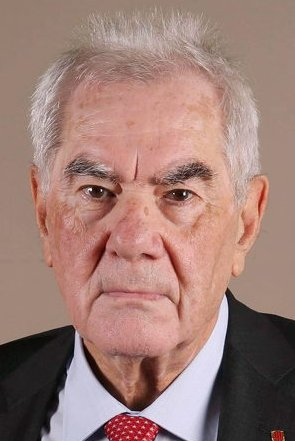

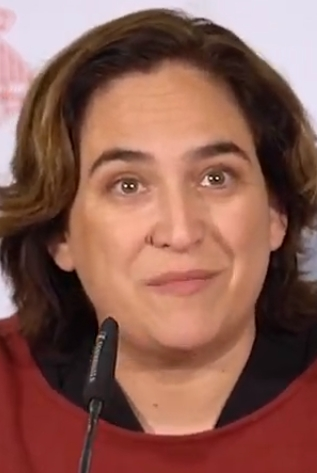

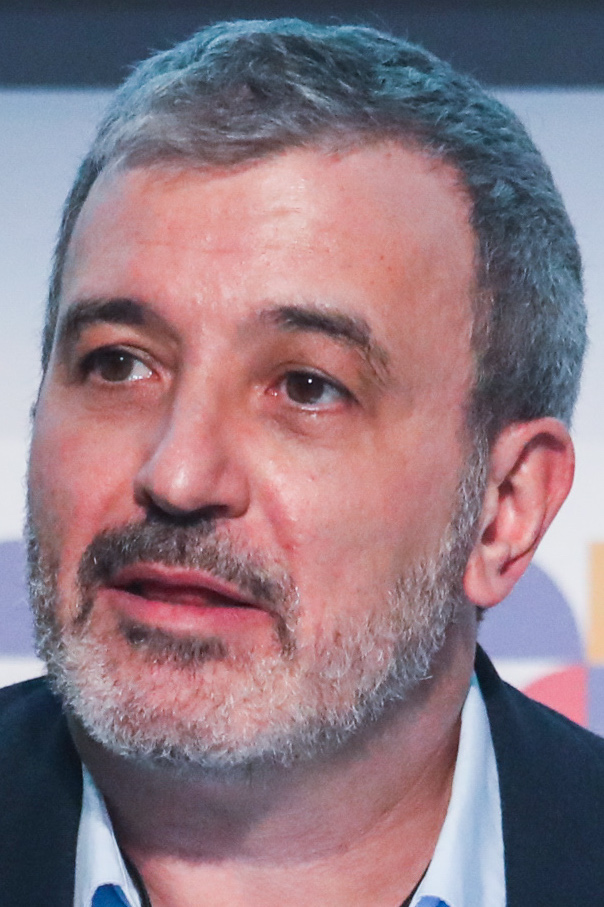

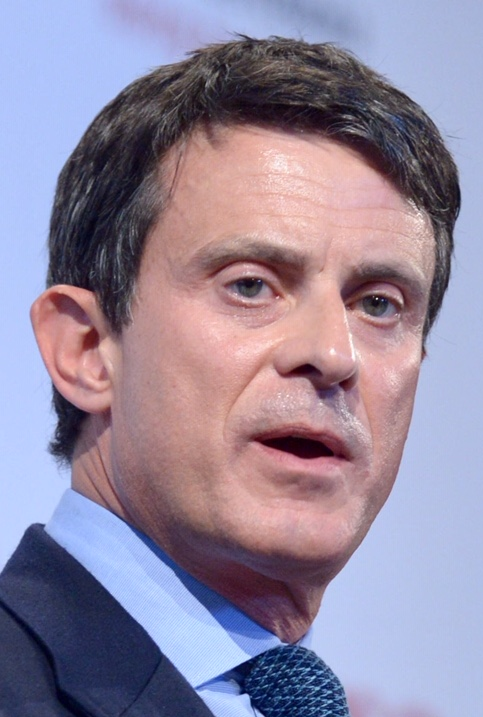

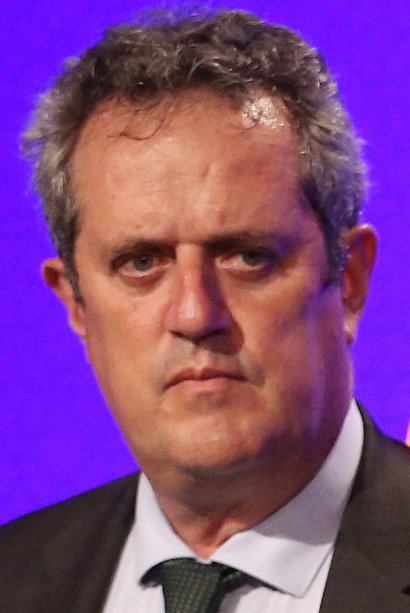

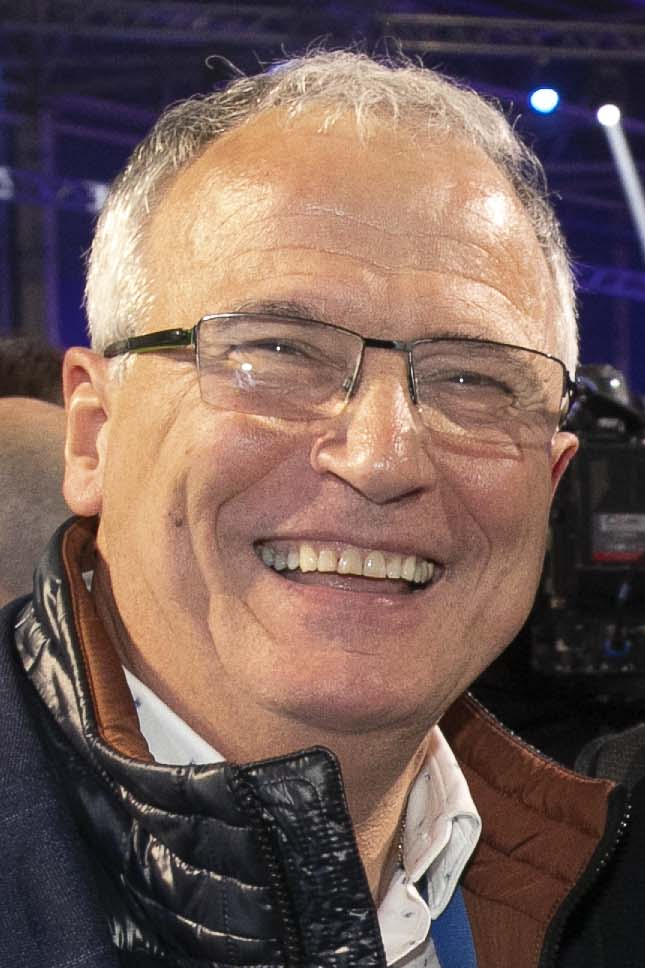
	First party	Second party	Third party
Leader	Ernest Maragall	Ada Colau	Jaume Collboni
Party	ERC+BCN–Nova–AM	BComú–ECG	PSC–CP
Leader since	27 October 2018	14 March 2015	5 May 2014
Last election	5 seats, 11.0%	11 seats, 25.2%	4 seats, 9.6%
Seats won	10	10	8
Seat change	▲5	▼1	▲4
Popular vote	161,189	156,493	138,885
Percentage	21.4%	20.7%	18.4%
Swing	▲10.4 pp	▼4.5 pp	▲8.8 pp
	Fourth party	Fifth party	Sixth party
Leader	Manuel Valls	Joaquim Forn (Note: In preventive detention in Lledoners (Barcelona) at the time of the election.)	Josep Bou
Party	BCN Canvi–Cs	Junts	PP
Leader since	25 September 2018	23 January 2019	12 December 2018
Last election	5 seats, 11.1%	10 seats, 22.8% (Note: Results for CiU in the 2015 election.)	3 seats, 8.7%
Seats won	6	5	2
Seat change	▲1	▼5	▼1
Popular vote	99,452	79,280	37,786
Percentage	13.2%	10.5%	5.0%
Swing	▲2.1 pp	▼12.3 pp	▼3.7 pp
Mayor before election
Ada Colau
BComú
Mayor after election
Ada Colau
BComú

A municipal election was held in Barcelona on 26 May 2019 to elect the 11th City Council of the municipality. All 41 seats in the City Council were up for election. It was held concurrently with regional elections in twelve autonomous communities and local elections all across Spain, as well as the 2019 European Parliament election in Spain.

The contest was won by Republican Left of Catalonia (ERC), which under the leadership of Ernest Maragall—brother of former Barcelona mayor and president of the Government of Catalonia Pasqual Maragall with the Socialists' Party of Catalonia (PSC)—came out on top in a municipal election in Barcelona for the first time in history, as a resurgent PSC drew votes away from incumbent mayor Ada Colau's Barcelona in Common (BComú). Colau was able to retain the mayorship through an BComú—PSC alliance that received the support of Barcelona for Change (BCN Canvi) councillors under Manuel Valls, the former prime minister of France, who after his failed run at the 2017 French presidential election was nominated by the liberal Citizens (Cs) to become their mayoral candidate in his city of birth. Valls's support of Colau's investiture was based on his stated intention to prevent the pro-Catalan independence camp from securing control over Catalonia's capital city.

Together for Catalonia (JxCat), the new brand of former Democratic Convergence of Catalonia (CDC) members who had openly embraced a Catalan independence ideology following the dissolution of the Convergence and Union (CiU) federation in June 2015, fell to fifth place to a record-low 10.5% of the vote under the leadership of Joaquim Forn, the former Interior minister who was at the time at preventive detention because of his involvement in the organization of the controversial 2017 Catalan independence referendum. Concurrently, support for the People's Party (PP) plummeted even further to its worst historical showing, barely passing the five percent threshold with 5.01%, whereas the Popular Unity Candidacy (CUP) was expelled from the city council altogether.

== Overview ==
Under the 1978 Constitution, the governance of municipalities in Spain—part of the country's local government system—was centered on the figure of city councils (Spanish: ayuntamientos), local corporations with independent legal personality composed of a mayor, a government council and an elected legislative assembly. The mayor was indirectly elected by the local assembly, requiring an absolute majority; otherwise, the candidate from the most-voted party automatically became mayor (ties were resolved by drawing lots). In the case of Barcelona, the top-tier administrative and governing body was the City Council of Barcelona.

=== Date ===
The term of local assemblies in Spain expired four years after the date of their previous election, with election day being fixed for the fourth Sunday of May every four years. The election decree was required to be issued no later than 54 days before the scheduled election date and published on the following day in the Official State Gazette (BOE). The previous local elections were held on 24 May 2015, setting the date for election day on the fourth Sunday of May four years later, which was 26 May 2019.

Local assemblies could not be dissolved before the expiration of their term, except in cases of mismanagement that seriously harmed the public interest and implied a breach of constitutional obligations, in which case the Council of Ministers could—optionally—decide to call a by-election.

Elections to the assemblies of local entities were officially called on 2 April 2019 with the publication of the corresponding decree in the BOE, setting election day for 26 May.

=== Electoral system ===
Voting for local assemblies was based on universal suffrage, comprising all Spanish nationals over 18 years of age, registered and residing in the municipality and with full political rights (provided that they had not been deprived of the right to vote by a final sentence), (Note: Amendments in 2018 granted the right to vote to those legally incapacitated.) as well as resident non-national European citizens, and those whose country of origin allowed reciprocal voting by virtue of a treaty.

Local councillors were elected using the D'Hondt method and closed-list proportional voting, with a five percent-threshold of valid votes (including blank ballots) in each municipality. Each municipality was a multi-member constituency, with a number of seats based on the following scale:

Population	Councillors
<100	3
101–250	5
251–1,000	7
1,001–2,000	9
2,001–5,000	11
5,001–10,000	13
10,001–20,000	17
20,001–50,000	21
50,001–100,000	25
>100,001	+1 per each 100,000 inhabitants or fraction +1 if total is an even number

The law did not provide for by-elections to fill vacant seats; instead, any vacancies arising after the proclamation of candidates and during the legislative term were filled by the next candidates on the party lists or, when required, by designated substitutes.

=== Outgoing council ===
The table below shows the composition of the political groups in the local assembly at the time of the election call.

Parliamentary composition in April 2019
Groups	Parties	Councillors	
Groups	Parties	Seats	Total
Barcelona in Common's Municipal Group	BComú	7	11
Barcelona in Common's Municipal Group	ICV	3	11
Barcelona in Common's Municipal Group	EUiA	1	11
Democratic Municipal Group	PDeCAT	7	9
Democratic Municipal Group	INDEP	2 (Note: Raimond Blasi and Sònia Recasens, former unio.cat councillors.)	9
Citizens's Municipal Group	Cs	5	5
Republican Municipal Group	ERC	4	4
Socialist Municipal Group	PSC	4	4
People's Party's Municipal Group	PP	3	3
Popular Unity Candidacy–Let's Reverse; Barcelona Municipal Group	CUP	3	3
Non-Inscrits	DC	1 (Note: Gerard Ardanuy, former UDC councillor.)	2
Non-Inscrits	INDEP	1 (Note: Juanjo Puigcorbé, former ERC councillor.)	2

== Parties and candidates ==
The electoral law allowed for parties and federations registered in the interior ministry, alliances and groupings of electors to present lists of candidates. Parties and federations intending to form an alliance were required to inform the relevant electoral commission within 10 days of the election call, whereas groupings of electors needed to secure the signature of a determined amount of the electors registered in the municipality for which they sought election, disallowing electors from signing for more than one list. In the case of Barcelona, as its population was over 1,000,001, at least 8,000 signatures were required. Additionally, a balanced composition of men and women was required in the electoral lists, so that candidates of either sex made up at least 40 percent of the total composition.

Below is a list of the main parties and alliances which contested the election:

Candidacy	Parties and alliances	Leading candidate	Ideology	Previous result		Gov.	Ref.
Candidacy	Parties and alliances	Leading candidate	Ideology	Vote %	Seats	Gov.	Ref.
BComú–ECG	List: Barcelona in Common (BComú); Catalonia in Common (CatComú) – Initiative for Catalonia Greens (ICV) – United and Alternative Left (EUiA) – Equo (Equo)	Ada Colau	Left-wing populism Participatory democracy	25.2%	11	Yes	
Junts	List: Catalan European Democratic Party (PDeCAT); Democratic Convergence of Catalonia (CDC) (Note: CDC was registered as an independent member within the alliance in order to allow its successor party, the PDeCAT, to be guaranteed CDC's public funding and electoral rights for the campaign.); Together for Catalonia (JxCat) – National Call for the Republic (CNxR)	Joaquim Forn	Catalan independence Liberalism	22.8%	10	No	
BCN Canvi–Cs	List: Citizens–Party of the Citizenry (Cs); Barcelona for Change (BCN Canvi)	Manuel Valls	Liberalism	11.0%	5	No	
ERC+BCN– Nova–AM	List: Republican Left of Catalonia (ERC); New (Nova)	Ernest Maragall	Catalan independence Left-wing nationalism Social democracy	11.0%	5	No	
PSC–CP	List: Socialists' Party of Catalonia (PSC–PSOE); United to Advance (Els Units)	Jaume Collboni	Social democracy	9.6%	4	No	
PP	List: People's Party (PP)	Josep Bou	Conservatism; Christian democracy	8.7%	3	No	
Capgirem; BCN–AMunt	List: Popular Unity Candidacy (CUP) – Forward–Socialist Organization of National Liberation (Endavant–OSAN) – Free People (PL–PPCC) – Internationalist Struggle (LI–CI); Let's Reverse (Capgirem)	Anna Saliente	Catalan independence Anti-capitalism; Socialism	7.4%	3	No	

== Campaign ==
=== Budget ===
Parties and alliances	Budget (self-reported)
BComú–ECG	€425,000
PSC–CP	€416,701
Junts	€320,000
ERC+BCN–Nova–AM	€246,250
Capgirem BCN–AMunt	€200,000
BCN Canvi–Cs	€170,000
PP	No data

According to a report from the Catalan newspaper Diari Ara, BCN Canvi–Cs candidate Manuel Valls would have received funds from a group of businessmen to prepare the campaign, that would have included a salary of €20,000 monthly for him. Valls rejected those accusations and said all funds he received for the campaign were declared.

== Opinion polls ==
The tables below list opinion polling results in reverse chronological order, showing the most recent first and using the dates when the survey fieldwork was done, as opposed to the date of publication. Where the fieldwork dates are unknown, the date of publication is given instead. The highest percentage figure in each polling survey is displayed with its background shaded in the leading party's colour. If a tie ensues, this is applied to the figures with the highest percentages. The "Lead" column on the right shows the percentage-point difference between the parties with the highest percentages in a poll.

=== Voting intention estimates ===
The table below lists weighted voting intention estimates. Refusals are generally excluded from the party vote percentages, while question wording and the treatment of "don't know" responses and those not intending to vote may vary between polling organisations. When available, seat projections determined by the polling organisations are displayed below (or in place of) the percentages in a smaller font; 21 seats were required for an absolute majority in the City Council of Barcelona.

Color key:

Poll conducted after legal ban on opinion polls

Polling firm/Commissioner	Fieldwork date	Sample size	Turnout	BComú	CDC PDeCAT	BCN Canvi–Cs	ERC	PSC	PP	CUP	Vox	JxSí	CatSíqueesPot	JxCat	BCAP	Lead
2019 municipal election	26 May 2019	—N/a	66.2	20.7; 10	(Note: Within JxCat.)	13.2; 6	21.4; 10	18.4; 8	5.0; 2	3.9; 0	1.2; 0	–	–	10.5; 5	3.7; 0	0.7
GESOP/El Periòdico	20–26 May 2019	?	67	22.0; 10/11		11.9; 5/6	22.5; 10/11	16.0; 7/8	3.4; 0	4.5; 0/2	? 0	–	–	12.4; 5/6	4.5; 0/2	0.5
GESOP/El Periòdic	22–24 May 2019	902	?	21.0; 9/10		12.5; 5/6	19.0; 9	15.0; 7	4.0; 0	6.0; 2	1.3; 0	–	–	13.0; 6	5.9; 2	2.0
GESOP/El Periòdic	21–23 May 2019	902	?	20.4; 9		12.5; 6	20.0; 9	15.0; 7	4.6; 0	5.3; 2	1.5; 0	–	–	12.9; 6	5.5; 2	0.4
ElectoPanel/Electomanía	22–23 May 2019	?	?	18.5; 9		14.0; 7	22.0; 11	16.6; 8	4.8; 0	4.8; 0	2.1; 0	–	–	11.8; 6	4.1; 0	3.5
ElectoPanel/Electomanía	21–22 May 2019	?	?	18.6; 9		13.9; 7	21.6; 11	16.6; 8	4.8; 0	4.6; 0	2.1; 0	–	–	12.3; 6	4.2; 0	3.0
GESOP/El Periòdic	20–22 May 2019	851	?	20.0; 9/10		12.2; 5/6	21.1; 9/10	15.4; 7	5.2; 2	5.0; 0/2	1.8; 0	–	–	12.0; 5/6	4.8; 0/2	1.1
ElectoPanel/Electomanía	20–21 May 2019	?	?	18.0; 9		13.8; 6	21.4; 10	16.7; 8	5.0; 2	4.2; 0	2.3; 0	–	–	12.4; 6	4.3; 0	3.4
GESOP/El Periòdic	18–21 May 2019	801	?	20.2; 9/10		12.5; 5/6	21.5; 10/11	15.5; 7/8	4.9; 0/2	5.0; 0/2	2.5; 0	–	–	11.5; 5/6	4.6; 0	1.3
GESOP/El Periòdic	17–20 May 2019	751	?	19.7; 9/10		12.3; 5/6	22.3; 11	16.2; 8	4.7; 0	5.2; 2	2.5; 0	–	–	10.4; 5	4.4; 0	2.6
ElectoPanel/Electomanía	19–20 May 2019	?	?	18.4; 9		14.0; 6	21.2; 10	16.8; 8	5.0; 2	4.2; 0	2.1; 0	–	–	12.1; 6	4.7; 0	2.8
GIPEyOP	7–20 May 2019	45	?	19.2; 9		12.1; 6	23.7; 11	17.8; 9	4.1; 0	4.1; 0	2.2; 0	–	–	12.4; 6	–	4.5
KeyData/Público	19 May 2019	?	?	21.5; 10		13.7; 6	22.9; 11	16.5; 7	5.2; 2	4.3; 0	1.9; 0	–	–	10.6; 5	–	1.4
ElectoPanel/Electomanía	16–19 May 2019	?	?	18.5; 9		13.9; 7	21.1; 10	16.7; 8	5.1; 2	4.3; 0	2.2; 0	–	–	11.7; 5	4.6; 0	2.6
GESOP/El Periódico	16–18 May 2019	756	?	20.4; 9/10		12.8; 5/6	21.5; 10	16.8; 8	4.1; 0	6.1; 2/3	–	–	–	11.0; 5	3.8; 0	1.1
Feedback/El Nacional	15–17 May 2019	800	68.2	18.9; 9/10		14.8; 6/7	22.6; 10/11	17.0; 7/8	5.5; 0/2	4.4; 0/2	1.3; 0	–	–	11.2; 5/6	3.1; 0	3.7
IMOP/El Confidencial	14–17 May 2019	819	?	21.5; 10/11		? 7	22.0; 10/11	17.3; 8	4.5; 0/2	? 0	2.5; 0	–	–	? 4	2.2; 0	0.5
NC Report/La Razón	13–16 May 2019	600	?	19.0; 9		12.6; 4	21.5; 10	16.2; 8	5.6; 2	5.2; 2	2.8; 0	–	–	13.8; 6	–	2.5
ElectoPanel/Electomanía	13–16 May 2019	?	?	18.4; 9		14.3; 7	20.8; 10	16.5; 8	5.0; 2	4.5; 0	2.0; 0	–	–	11.4; 5	4.4; 0	2.4
Sigma Dos/El Mundo	12–14 May 2019	500	?	20.3; 9		12.3; 5/6	22.0; 9/10	19.6; 8/9	5.2; 2	2.2; 0	1.4; 0	–	–	14.8; 6/7	–	1.7
Feedback/El Nacional	9–14 May 2019	800	69.8	19.8; 8/9		15.2; 6/7	21.0; 9/10	16.4; 6/7	5.3; 2	4.1; 0/2	–	–	–	11.6; 5/6	4.1; 0/2	1.2
ElectoPanel/Electomanía	10–13 May 2019	?	?	19.2; 10		14.4; 7	21.8; 11	16.7; 8	4.5; 0	4.1; 0	2.5; 0	–	–	11.3; 5	3.2; 0	2.6
Time Consultants/Crónica Global	3–13 May 2019	800	?	? 9/10		9.4; 4/5	28.8; 12/14	? 7/8	? 0	? 0	0.5; 0	–	–	9.8; 5/6	4.7; 0/2	?
ElectoPanel/Electomanía	7–10 May 2019	?	?	18.8; 9		14.2; 7	21.2; 10	17.7; 9	4.6; 0	4.3; 0	2.3; 0	–	–	12.0; 6	3.6; 0	2.4
GAD3/La Vanguardia	7–9 May 2019	1,034	?	22.1; 10		12.3; 5/6	24.2; 11	16.8; 7/8	5.2; 2	4.1; 0	1.8; 0	–	–	10.8; 5	–	2.1
40dB/El País	3–8 May 2019	800	?	20.1; 9/10		12.3; 6	22.6; 11	15.2; 7/8	4.7; 0/2	3.9; 0	–	–	–	11.5; 5/6	–	2.5
ElectoPanel/Electomanía	4–7 May 2019	?	?	18.7; 9		14.5; 7	21.4; 11	18.3; 9	4.3; 0	4.2; 0	2.3; 0	–	–	11.0; 5	3.7; 0	2.7
GESOP/El Periódico	1–4 May 2019	803	?	20.0; 9/10		13.1; 6	22.5; 11	16.6; 8	4.6; 0/2	4.0; 0	–	–	–	12.0; 5/6	3.5; 0	2.5
ElectoPanel/Electomanía	29 Apr–4 May 2019	?	?	18.5; 9		14.8; 7	21.1; 11	18.4; 9	4.4; 0	4.4; 0	2.0; 0	–	–	10.7; 5	3.8; 0	2.6
Feedback/El Nacional	29 Apr–2 May 2019	800	72.1	19.6; 9		15.9; 7	20.8; 10	18.0; 8	6.7; 3	3.2; 0	–	–	–	9.1; 4	3.7; 0	1.2
April 2019 general election	28 Apr 2019	—N/a	78.3	16.3 (7)		11.7 (5)	23.1 (11)	22.8 (11)	6.2 (2)	3.3 (0)	3.4 (0)	–	–	10.9 (5)	–	0.3
CIS	21 Mar–23 Apr 2019	782	?	23.0; 10/11		11.9; 5/6	22.9; 9/11	12.9; 6/7	6.0; 2/3	5.3; 2	1.9; 0	–	–	11.2; 5/7	–	0.1
ElectoPanel/Electomanía	31 Mar–7 Apr 2019	?	?	16.6; 8		14.3; 7	22.2; 11	15.3; 7	4.7; 0	6.1; 3	2.3; 0	–	–	11.9; 5	4.9; 0	5.6
ElectoPanel/Electomanía	24–31 Mar 2019	?	?	16.4; 8		14.8; 7	22.0; 11	15.4; 7	4.6; 0	6.0; 3	2.3; 0	–	–	11.9; 5	4.7; 0	5.6
CES/Metrópoli Abierta	21–28 Mar 2019	800	?	20.4; 9		10.8; 5	23.8; 11	16.6; 7	4.5; 0	6.6; 3	–	–	–	13.8; 6	–	3.4
ElectoPanel/Electomanía	17–24 Mar 2019	?	?	16.3; 8		14.5; 7	22.5; 11	15.8; 7	4.7; 0	5.6; 2	2.3; 0	–	–	11.9; 6	4.1; 0	6.2
ElectoPanel/Electomanía	10–17 Mar 2019	?	?	16.7; 8		13.7; 6	22.9; 11	15.1; 7	4.8; 0	6.0; 3	2.7; 0	–	–	12.4; 6	3.8; 0	6.2
ElectoPanel/Electomanía	3–10 Mar 2019	?	?	16.9; 8		14.3; 7	22.8; 11	14.9; 7	4.7; 0	5.8; 2	2.7; 0	–	–	12.3; 6	3.6; 0	5.9
ElectoPanel/Electomanía	22 Feb–3 Mar 2019	?	?	17.0; 8		14.4; 7	22.9; 11	14.6; 7	4.7; 0	6.0; 2	2.9; 0	–	–	12.6; 6	2.9; 0	5.9
Time Consultants/Crónica Global	23 Feb 2019	?	?	19.4; 9		13.3; 6	25.6; 12	13.6; 6	4.6; 0	6.6; 3	–	–	–	11.6; 5	–	6.2
Feedback/El Nacional	18–21 Feb 2019	800	66.4	15.4; 7		16.5; 7/8	20.9; 10	16.2; 7	5.1; 2	5.6; 2	–	–	–	11.9; 5	4.1; 0/1	4.4
ERC	10 Feb 2019	?	?	? 8/9		? 8	? 9	? 5/6	? 0	? 3	? 2	–	–	? 5	–	?
Convergents	19 Nov–12 Dec 2018	400	?	16.8; 8	? 4	? 6	? 11	17.5; 8	? 0	? 2	–	–	–	–	–	?
Time Consultants/Crónica Global	20–29 Nov 2018	800	?	17.8; 8	9.9; 4	15.0; 7	26.6; 13	16.0; 7	3.3; 0	6.0; 2	–	–	–	–	2.9; 0	8.8
GESOP/El Periódico	2–4 Oct 2018	802	?	19.5; 8/9	11.5; 5	15.5; 7	23.5; 10/11	13.5; 6	4.0; 0	8.0; 3/4	–	–	–	–	–	4.0
GAD3/La Vanguardia	4–7 Jun 2018	803	?	21.8; 10/11	11.4; 5	19.9; 9/10	17.6; 8	15.4; 7	4.1; 0	5.0; 0/2	–	–	–	–	–	1.9
GESOP/El Periódico	14–16 May 2018	800	?	20.9; 9/10	13.7; 6	18.0; 8/9	18.0; 8/9	11.6; 5	4.0; 0	9.4; 4	–	–	–	–	–	2.9
Time Consultants/Crónica Global	18–27 Apr 2018	800	?	17.3; 8	17.7; 8	17.5; 8	21.0; 9	13.3; 6	2.7; 0	8.1; 2	–	–	–	–	–	3.3
2017 regional election	21 Dec 2017	—N/a	81.6	9.3 (4)		24.0 (10)	20.9 (9)	14.5 (6)	5.0 (2)	5.3 (2)	–	–	–	19.6 (8)	–	3.1
NC Report/La Razón	13–18 Nov 2017	600	56.7	17.6; 8	13.3; 6	17.4; 8	19.3; 8	14.9; 6	7.6; 3	6.2; 2	–	–	–	–	–	1.7
GESOP/El Periódico	15–18 May 2017	800	?	27.5; 12	13.5; 6	11.5; 5	17.0; 8	11.9; 5	8.0; 3	5.3; 2	–	–	–	–	–	10.5
2016 general election	26 Jun 2016	—N/a	67.6	25.7 (11)	13.5 (6)	11.3 (5)	17.4 (7)	14.1 (6)	15.2 (6)	–	–	–	–	–	–	8.3
NC Report/La Razón	29 May 2016	?	?	22.6; 10	19.2; 8	13.4; 6	12.7; 5	11.3; 5	9.1; 4	7.9; 3	–	–	–	–	–	3.4
2015 general election	20 Dec 2015	—N/a	72.3	26.6 (12)	14.5 (6)	13.1 (6)	15.2 (6)	13.2 (6)	12.7 (5)	–	–	–	–	–	–	10.4
2015 regional election	27 Sep 2015	—N/a	77.1	–	(Note: Within JxSí.)	17.7 (8)		11.5 (5)	9.2 (4)	10.0 (4)	–	37.2 (16)	9.8 (4)	–	–	19.5
NC Report/La Razón	26 Jul–8 Aug 2015	900	52.3	20.9; 10	17.5; 8	14.3; 6	11.1; 5	10.9; 5	8.2; 3	9.5; 4	–	–	–	–	–	3.4
2015 municipal election	24 May 2015	—N/a	60.6	25.2; 11	22.8; 10	11.0; 5	11.0; 5	9.6; 4	8.7; 3	7.4; 3	0.2; 0	–	–	–	–	2.4

=== Voting preferences ===
The table below lists raw, unweighted voting preferences.

Color key:

Poll conducted after legal ban on opinion polls

Polling firm/Commissioner	Fieldwork date	Sample size	BComú	CDC PDeCAT	BCN Canvi–Cs	ERC	PSC	PP	CUP	Vox	JxSí	CatSíqueesPot	JxCat	BCAP	Question	X mark	Lead
2019 municipal election	26 May 2019	—N/a	13.7		8.7	14.1	12.2	3.3	2.6	0.8	–	–	6.9	2.5	—N/a	33.8	0.4
GESOP/El Periòdic	22–24 May 2019	902	20.6		5.6	14.8	12.7	1.0	4.3	0.6	–	–	7.3	4.2	28.0		5.8
GESOP/El Periòdic	21–23 May 2019	902	20.3		6.4	17.0	12.0	1.2	3.5	0.8	–	–	7.3	4.3	26.5		3.3
GESOP/El Periòdic	20–22 May 2019	851	20.4		6.8	17.8	13.4	1.6	3.0	1.0	–	–	5.9	3.3	26.1		2.6
GESOP/El Periòdic	18–21 May 2019	801	19.3		7.2	19.0	13.4	1.7	2.5	1.1	–	–	6.4	3.0	26.1		0.3
GESOP/El Periòdic	17–20 May 2019	751	18.2		6.7	18.6	14.5	1.5	2.3	0.9	–	–	5.4	2.8	29.0		0.4
GAD3/La Vanguardia	7–9 May 2019	1,034	18.7		6.8	25.3	15.5	2.3	3.0	–	–	–	5.1	–	–	–	6.6
GESOP/El Periódico	1–4 May 2019	803	15.5		6.3	18.1	14.1	1.2	1.6	–	–	–	3.8	2.1	31.9	3.5	2.6
April 2019 general election (Note: Does not include non-resident citizens.)	28 Apr 2019	—N/a	12.7		9.1	18.0	17.8	4.8	2.6	2.6	–	–	8.5	–	—N/a	21.7	0.2
CIS	21 Mar–23 Apr 2019	782	15.1		5.0	15.3	9.5	2.2	3.2	0.8	–	–	4.5	–	36.7	5.8	0.2
ODEC/City Council	4–14 Jun 2018	800	16.2	5.6	5.2	12.4	6.1	0.6	3.6	–	–	–	–	–	42.4	6.6	3.8
GESOP/El Periódico	14–16 May 2018	800	16.0	4.4	10.5	13.8	7.4	1.5	4.5	–	–	–	–	–	34.1	3.8	2.2
2017 regional election	21 Dec 2017	—N/a	7.6		19.5	17.0	11.8	4.1	4.3	–	–	–	15.9	–	—N/a	18.4	2.5
GESOP/City Council	23 Nov–4 Dec 2017	800	16.3	5.8	6.4	16.5	9.3	1.0	3.6	–	–	–	–	–	32.8	5.5	0.2
GESOP/City Council	25 May–7 Jun 2017	812	15.7	5.9	5.9	14.5	6.0	1.2	2.4	–	–	–	–	–	34.1	10.0	1.2
GESOP/El Periódico	15–18 May 2017	800	16.5	6.1	4.9	13.0	6.9	2.9	2.9	–	–	–	–	–	32.1	8.1	3.5
DYM/City Council	21 Nov–9 Dec 2016	800	15.1	5.8	4.4	11.9	5.0	1.3	2.9	–	–	–	–	–	40.0	10.8	3.2
2016 general election	26 Jun 2016	—N/a	17.3	9.1	7.6	11.7	9.5	10.2	–	–	–	–	–	–	—N/a	32.4	5.6
DYM/City Council	17–25 May 2016	800	17.9	8.5	4.4	12.3	5.5	1.6	3.8	–	–	–	–	–	33.8	9.4	5.6
2015 general election	20 Dec 2015	—N/a	19.1	10.5	9.4	10.9	9.5	9.1	–	–	–	–	–	–	—N/a	27.7	8.2
IEP–DEP/City Council	24 Nov–4 Dec 2015	800	15.6	9.0	8.8	10.6	6.3	2.6	3.0	–	–	–	–	–	34.2	7.6	5.0
2015 regional election	27 Sep 2015	—N/a	–		13.6		8.8	7.0	7.7	–	28.6	7.5	–	–	—N/a	22.9	15.0
2015 municipal election	24 May 2015	—N/a	15.2	13.7	6.7	6.6	5.8	5.3	4.5	0.1	–	–	–	–	—N/a	39.4	1.5

=== Victory preferences ===
The table below lists opinion polling on the victory preferences for each party in the event of a municipal election taking place.

Polling firm/Commissioner	Fieldwork date	Sample size	BComú	CDC PDeCAT	BCN Canvi–Cs	ERC	PSC	PP	CUP	Other/ None	Question	Lead
GAD3/La Vanguardia	4–7 Jun 2018	803	23.9	8.7	18.0	9.9	5.7	0.9	0.6	0.4	31.8	5.9

=== Victory likelihood ===
The table below lists opinion polling on the perceived likelihood of victory for each party in the event of a municipal election taking place.

Color key:

Poll conducted after legal ban on opinion polls

Polling firm/Commissioner	Fieldwork date	Sample size	BComú	BCN Canvi–Cs	ERC	PSC	PP	Vox	JxCat	BCAP	Other/ None	Question	Lead
GESOP/El Periòdic	22–24 May 2019	902	30.1	–	32.8	7.0	–	–	–	–	3.0	27.0	2.7
GESOP/El Periòdic	21–23 May 2019	902	30.5	–	35.0	6.2	–	–	–	–	3.0	25.2	4.5
GESOP/El Periòdic	20–22 May 2019	851	33.3	–	33.1	6.6	–	–	–	–	3.0	23.9	0.2
GESOP/El Periòdic	18–21 May 2019	801	30.8	–	35.4	6.6	–	–	–	–	3.3	23.9	4.5
GESOP/El Periòdic	17–20 May 2019	751	29.0	–	34.9	7.8	–	–	–	–	3.3	25.1	5.9
GESOP/El Periódico	16–18 May 2019	756	26.7	–	38.6	6.9	–	–	–	–	3.0	24.7	11.9
GAD3/La Vanguardia	7–9 May 2019	1,034	13.9	1.2	41.8	15.4	0.9	0.1	1.0	0.3	0.5	24.9	26.4

=== Preferred Mayor ===
The table below lists opinion polling on leader preferences to become mayor of Barcelona.

Color key:

Poll conducted after legal ban on opinion polls

Polling firm/Commissioner	Fieldwork date	Sample size										Other/ None/ Not care	Question	Lead
Polling firm/Commissioner	Fieldwork date	Sample size	Colau BComú	Valls Cs	Maragall ERC	Collboni PSC	Bou PP	Saliente CUP	Forn Junts	Elsa Artadi Junts	Graupera BCAP	Other/ None/ Not care	Question	Lead
GESOP/El Periòdic	22–24 May 2019	902	26.7	8.2	16.9	11.5	–	–	–	7.4	–	–	–	9.8
GESOP/El Periòdic	21–23 May 2019	902	25.9	7.9	19.3	10.4	–	–	–	7.1	–	–	–	6.6
GESOP/El Periòdic	20–22 May 2019	851	27.0	7.0	19.6	11.4	–	–	–	6.6	–	–	–	7.4
GESOP/El Periòdic	18–21 May 2019	801	25.5	7.5	21.7	11.4	2.3	1.9	–	6.6	4.7	4.3	14.0	3.8
GESOP/El Periòdic	17–20 May 2019	751	25.5	8.6	21.0	12.0	2.4	2.4	–	5.6	4.8	4.0	13.5	4.5
GESOP/El Periódico	16–18 May 2019	756	24.9	10.2	20.8	11.9	–	–	–	5.8	–	–	–	4.1
IMOP/El Confidencial	14–17 May 2019	819	26.0	10.7	17.6	10.5	–	–	6.1	–	–	–	–	8.4
GESOP/El Periódico	1–4 May 2019	803	24.5	9.1	18.3	8.9	1.2	1.8	7.8	–	4.5	3.5	20.4	5.9

== Results ==
← Summary of the 26 May 2019 City Council of Barcelona election results →
Parties and alliances	Popular vote			Seats	
Parties and alliances	Votes	%	±pp	Total	+/−
ERC–Mayor Ernest Maragall+BCN–Nova–AM (ERC+BCN–Nova–AM)	161,189	21.37	+10.36	10	+5
Barcelona in Common–In Common We Win (BComú–ECG)	156,493	20.74	−4.47	10	−1
PSC–Commitment to Barcelona–United–Progress Candidacy (PSC–CP)	138,885	18.41	+8.78	8	+4
Barcelona for Change–Citizens (BCN Canvi–Cs)^{1}	99,452	13.18	+2.15	6	+1
Together (Junts)^{2}	79,280	10.51	−12.24	5	−5
People's Party (PP)	37,786	5.01	−3.70	2	−1
CUP–Let's Reverse Barcelona–Municipalist Alternative (Capgirem BCN–AMunt)	29,318	3.89	−3.53	0	−3
Barcelona is Capital–Primaries (BCAP–Primàries)	28,253	3.74	New	0	±0
Vox (Vox)	8,751	1.16	+0.94	0	±0
Animalist Party Against Mistreatment of Animals (PACMA)	6,181	0.82	±0.00	0	±0
The Eco-pacifist Greens (EVEP)	1,891	0.25	New	0	±0
Citizen Force (FC's)	1,197	0.16	New	0	±0
United and Socialists+ for Democracy (Unidos SI–DEF)	501	0.07	New	0	±0
Blank Seats (EB)	432	0.06	−0.22	0	±0
Convergents (CNV)	379	0.05	New	0	±0
Communist Party of the Catalan People (PCPC)	373	0.05	−0.04	0	±0
European Retirees Social Democratic Party (PDSJE)	313	0.04	New	0	±0
Act (PACT)	303	0.04	New	0	±0
Family and Life Party (PFiV)	215	0.03	New	0	±0
For a Fairer World (PUM+J)	195	0.03	New	0	±0
Libertarian Party (P–LIB)	144	0.02	−0.02	0	±0
Spanish Phalanx of the CNSO (FE de las JONS)	132	0.02	−0.05	0	±0
dCIDE (Of Spanish Centre-Left) (dCIDE)	93	0.01	New	0	±0
We, Party of Social Regeneration (NPRS)	47	0.01	New	0	±0
Barcelona is you (BCN ets tú)	5	0.00	New	0	±0
Blank ballots	2,635	0.35	−0.56		
Total	754,443			41	±0
Valid votes	754,443	99.80	+0.24		
Invalid votes	1,540	0.20	−0.24		
Votes cast / turnout	755,983	66.17	+5.58		
Abstentions	386,461	33.83	−5.58		
Registered voters	1,142,444				
Sources
Footnotes: ^{1} Barcelona for Change–Citizens results are compared to Citizens–Party of the Citizenry totals in the 2015 election.; ^{2} Together results are compared to Convergence and Union totals in the 2015 election.

Popular vote
ERC–Nova–AM	21.37%
BComú–ECG	20.74%
PSC–CP	18.41%
BCN Canvi–Cs	13.18%
Junts	10.51%
PP	5.01%
Capgirem BCN	3.89%
BCAP–Primàries	3.74%
Vox	1.16%
Others	1.64%
Blank ballots	0.35%

Seats
ERC–Nova–AM	24.39%
BComú–ECG	24.39%
PSC–CP	19.51%
BCN Canvi–Cs	14.63%
Junts	12.20%
PP	4.88%

== Aftermath ==
=== Government formation ===
Investiture
Ballot →	15 June 2019	
Required majority →	21 out of 41	
Ada Colau (BComú): • BComú (10); • PSC (8); • BCN Canvi (2); • Cs (1)	21 / 41	check
Ernest Maragall (ERC): • ERC (10); • JxCat (5)	15 / 41	X mark
Josep Bou (PP): • PP (2)	2 / 41	X mark
Abstentions/Blank ballots: • Cs (3)	3 / 41	
Absentees	0 / 41	

== Bibliography ==
- Constitución Española (Constitution). Official State Gazette (in Spanish). 27 December 1978 [version as of 27 September 2011]. BOE-A-1978-31229.
- Ley 7/1985, de 2 de abril, Reguladora de las Bases del Régimen Local (Law 7/1985). Official State Gazette (in Spanish). 2 April 1985 [version as of 4 August 2018]. BOE-A-1985-5392.
- Ley Orgánica 5/1985, de 19 de junio, del Régimen Electoral General (Organic Law 5/1985). Official State Gazette (in Spanish). 19 June 1985 [version as of 6 March 2019]. BOE-A-1985-11672.
- Real Decreto 209/2019, de 1 de abril, por el que se convocan elecciones locales y a las Asambleas de Ceuta y Melilla para el 26 de mayo de 2019 (Royal Decree 209/2019). Official State Gazette (in Spanish). 1 April 2019. BOE-A-2019-4824.
