= Valents =

Brave Valents
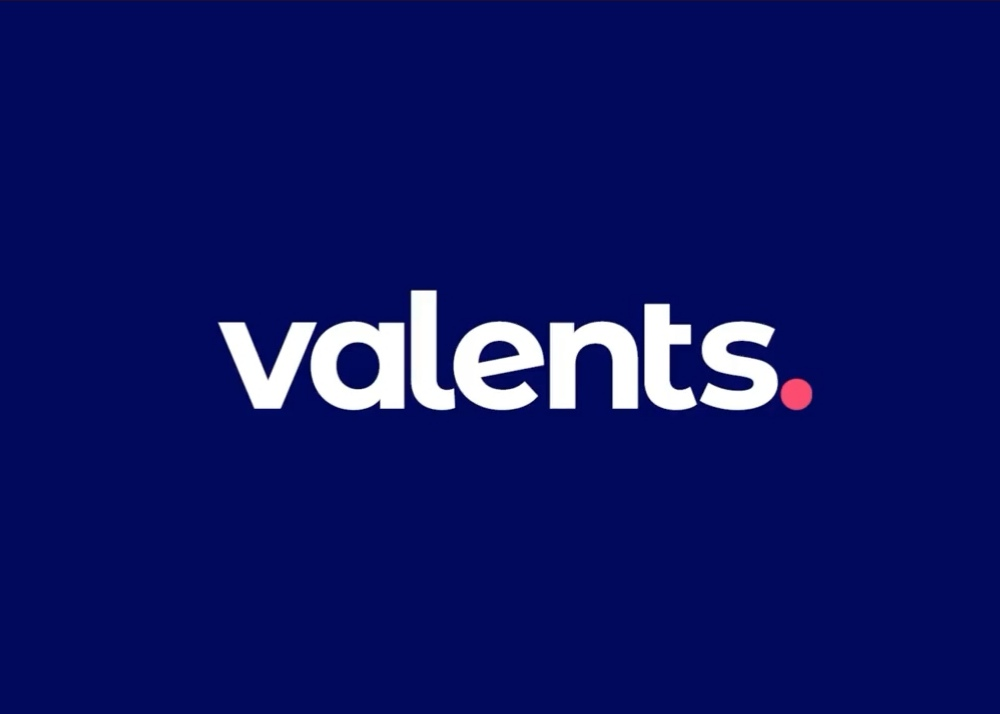
- President: Eva Parera
- Secretary General: Albert Guivernau
- Founder: Manuel Valls
- Founded: 28 March 2019
- Dissolved: 15 July 2023
- Headquarters: Plaça de Sant Jaume, 1, planta 2; 08002, Barcelona
- Ideology: Liberal conservatism Spanish unionism
- Political position: Centre-right
- Slogan: ¡Cataluña es mucho más!

Website
- valents.cat

Brave (Catalan: Valents), founded as Barcelona for Change (Catalan: Barcelona pel Canvi), was a political party in Catalonia, founded by former Prime Minister of France Manuel Valls to contest the 2019 Barcelona City Council election. A month after the elections, BCNCanvi and Cs broke their collaboration in the Barcelona City Council, forming two separate groups in the city council, with 4 councillors for Cs and 2 for BCNcanvi.

In June 2021, Marilén Barceló, one of the 4 councillors of Cs, would defect to BCNCanvi. In December 2021, the party was refounded by Eva Parera with the current name: Valents.

== History ==
=== Beginning ===
Manuel Valls announced in a press conference in 2018 the name of the party focused on the 2019 Barcelona City Council election and his bid for the Mayor of Barcelona. On 23 October 2018, Valls positioned himself as the candidate of all the Barcelonese «elites», even the cultural ones. BCNcanvi was supported by other politicians from Cs such as Inés Arrimadas, Units per Avançar, Lliures and businessmen and media personalities such as Josep Maria Bricall

On 22 January 2019, Lliures decided to join the lists of BCNcanvi, followed by Unión Progreso y Democracia in February 2019. Afterwards, in an attempt to gain votes from the PSC, Valls presented former socialist minister, Celestino Corbacho as number 3 on his lists, followed by politicians from Cs and Units per Avançar (Eva Parera)

=== Elections Aftermath and Breakup ===
The list obtained 6 councillors, however the coalition fell apart as soon as Valls announced his support for the re-election of Ada Colau, leaving BCNcanvi with 3 councillors, soon to be 2 after Celestino Corbacho defected to Cs

=== Valents and establishment of a brand ===
In December 2021, the party changed its name to Valents.

In January 2022, 2 former MPs of Citizens joined Valents with Eva Parera, Jorge Soler González becoming chair of Valents in Girona and Jean Castel in Lleida. As well, the 3 councillors of Citizens in Sitges defected to Valents.

On 24 January it was announced that the 80 members of Centrats per Tarragona switched over to Valents, along with the 2 councillors in La Pobla de Montornès.
