= Avinguda Carrilet station =

Metro station in Barcelona, Spain

Avinguda Carrilet
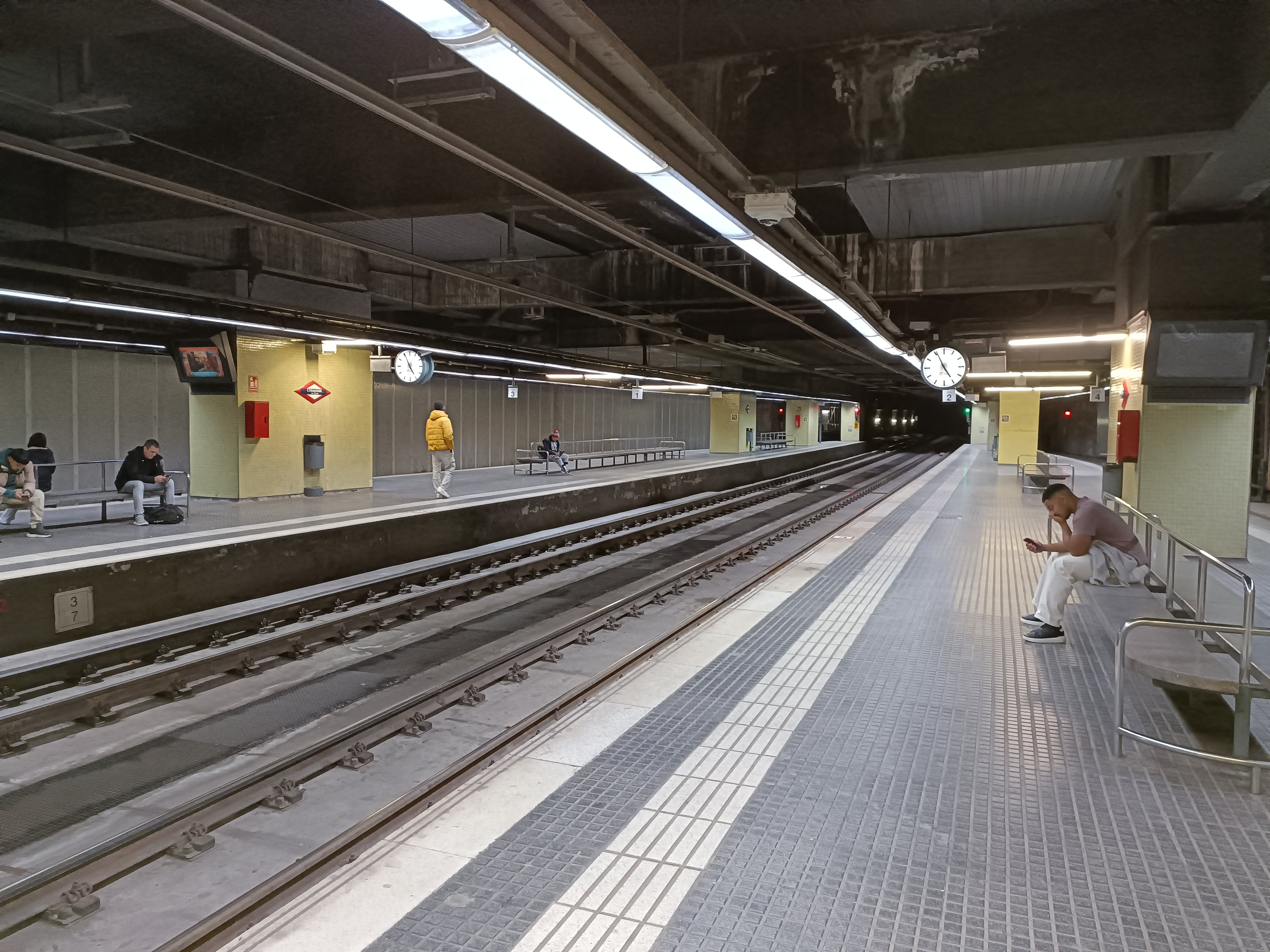
- View of the FGC station platforms

General information
- Location: Avinguda Carrilet; 08907 L'Hospitalet de Llobregat; Catalonia; Spain
- Coordinates: 41°21′28.6″N 2°06′09.8″E
- System: FGC rapid transit and commuter rail station Barcelona Metro rapid transit station
- Owner: Government of Catalonia
- Operator: Ferrocarrils de la Generalitat de Catalunya (FGC; Llobregat–Anoia Line); Transports Metropolitans de Barcelona (TMB; Barcelona Metro line 1)
- Lines: Llobregat–Anoia Line; Barcelona Metro line 1
- Platforms: 2 island platforms (Llobregat–Anoia Line); 2 side platforms (Barcelona Metro line 1)
- Tracks: 4 (Llobregat–Anoia Line); 2 (Barcelona Metro line 1)
- Connections: Urban buses

Construction
- Structure type: Underground
- Cycle facilities: A bicycle parking rack is located in the station hall of the Llobregat–Anoia Line.
- Accessible: The station entrance from Avinguda Carrilet is fully accessible.

Other information
- Station code: 113 (Barcelona Metro line 1)
- Fare zone: 1 (ATM Àrea de Barcelona)

History
- Opened: 1912; 114 years ago (Llobregat–Anoia Line); 1987; 39 years ago (Barcelona Metro line 1)
- Rebuilt: 9 July 1985 (Llobregat–Anoia Line)
- Original company: Camino de Hierro del Nordeste (Llobregat–Anoia Line)
- Post-grouping: Compañía General de les Ferrocarriles Catalanes (CGFC; Llobregat–Anoia Line)

Passengers
- 2013: 1,994,266 (Note: Passenger figures according to recorded annual entries.) (Llobregat–Anoia Line)

Services
Preceding station	FGC	Following station
Almeda towards Molí Nou-Ciutat Cooperativa	L8	Sant Josep towards Barcelona Pl. Espanya
Almeda towards Can Ros	S33	Sant Josep towards Barcelona Pl. Espanya
Almeda towards Olesa de Montserrat	S4	Sant Josep towards Barcelona Pl. Espanya
Almeda towards Martorell Enllaç	S8	Sant Josep towards Barcelona Pl. Espanya
Almeda towards Manresa Baixador	R5	Sant Josep towards Barcelona Pl. Espanya
Almeda towards Igualada	R6	Sant Josep towards Barcelona Pl. Espanya
Almeda towards Manresa Baixador	R50	Sant Josep towards Barcelona Pl. Espanya
Almeda towards Igualada	R60	Sant Josep towards Barcelona Pl. Espanya
Preceding station	Metro	Following station
Bellvitge towards Hospital de Bellvitge	L1	Rambla Just Oliveras towards Fondo
Location
- Location within Barcelona

Avinguda Carrilet (Catalan pronunciation: [əβiŋˈɡuðə kəriˈlɛt]), also known as L'Hospitalet-Avinguda Carrilet, is an interchange complex underneath Avinguda Carrilet in the L'Hospitalet de Llobregat municipality, to the south-west of Barcelona, in Catalonia, Spain. It consists of a railway station on the Llobregat–Anoia Line and a Barcelona Metro line 1 (L1) station. The Llobregat–Anoia Line station is served by Barcelona Metro line 8 (L8), Baix Llobregat Metro lines S33, S4 and S8, and commuter rail lines R5, R6, R50 and R60. The services on the Llobregat–Anoia Line (including the L8) are operated by Ferrocarrils de la Generalitat de Catalunya (FGC), whilst Line 1 is operated by Transports Metropolitans de Barcelona (TMB).

== Location ==
The platforms used by the Llobregat–Anoia Line are located between Rambla de la Marina and Plaça de la Mare de Déu de Montserrat. They comprise two island platforms, each flanked by a pair of tracks, with the two inner tracks on the main line and the outer tracks on loops off the main line. The L1 platforms are located underneath Rambla de la Marina, between Avinguda Carrilet and Carrer Prat de la Riba, comprising two 96-metre-long (315 ft) side platforms.

== History ==
The original at-grade station for the Llobregat–Anoia Line was opened in 1912 by the company Camino de Hierro del Nordeste ("Northeastern Railway"). On 9 July 1985, the line's section between Sant Josep and Cornellà Riera stations was put underground and the current station started operating. The L1 station dates from 1987, when the line was extended southwards from Torrassa station. It served as the L1's southern terminus until 1989, when that line was extended to Hospital de Bellvitge station.

== Accesses ==
The station has the following entrances:

- Avinguda Carrilet
- Carrer Prat de la Riba

== Gallery ==
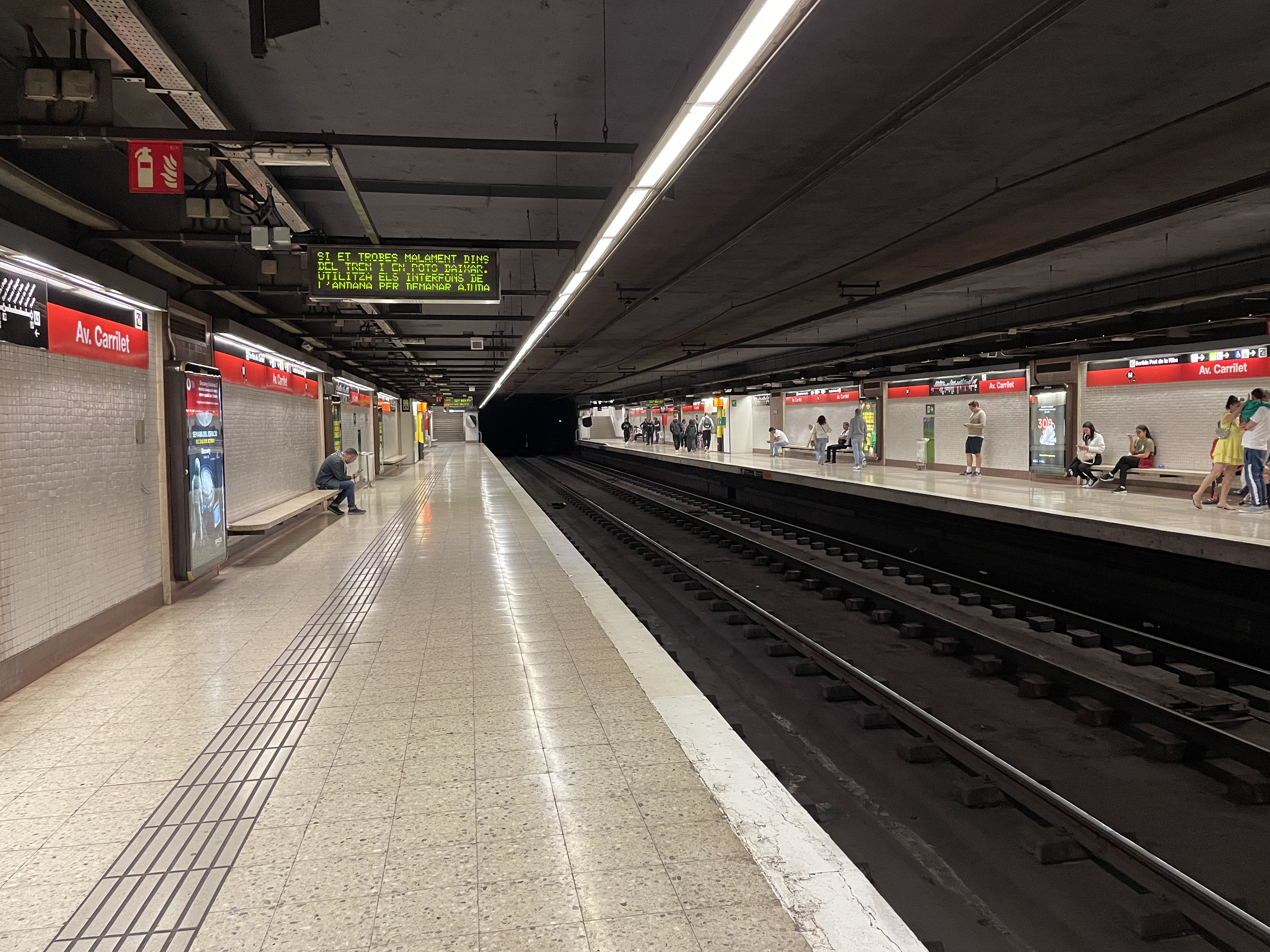
View of the Line 1 station platforms

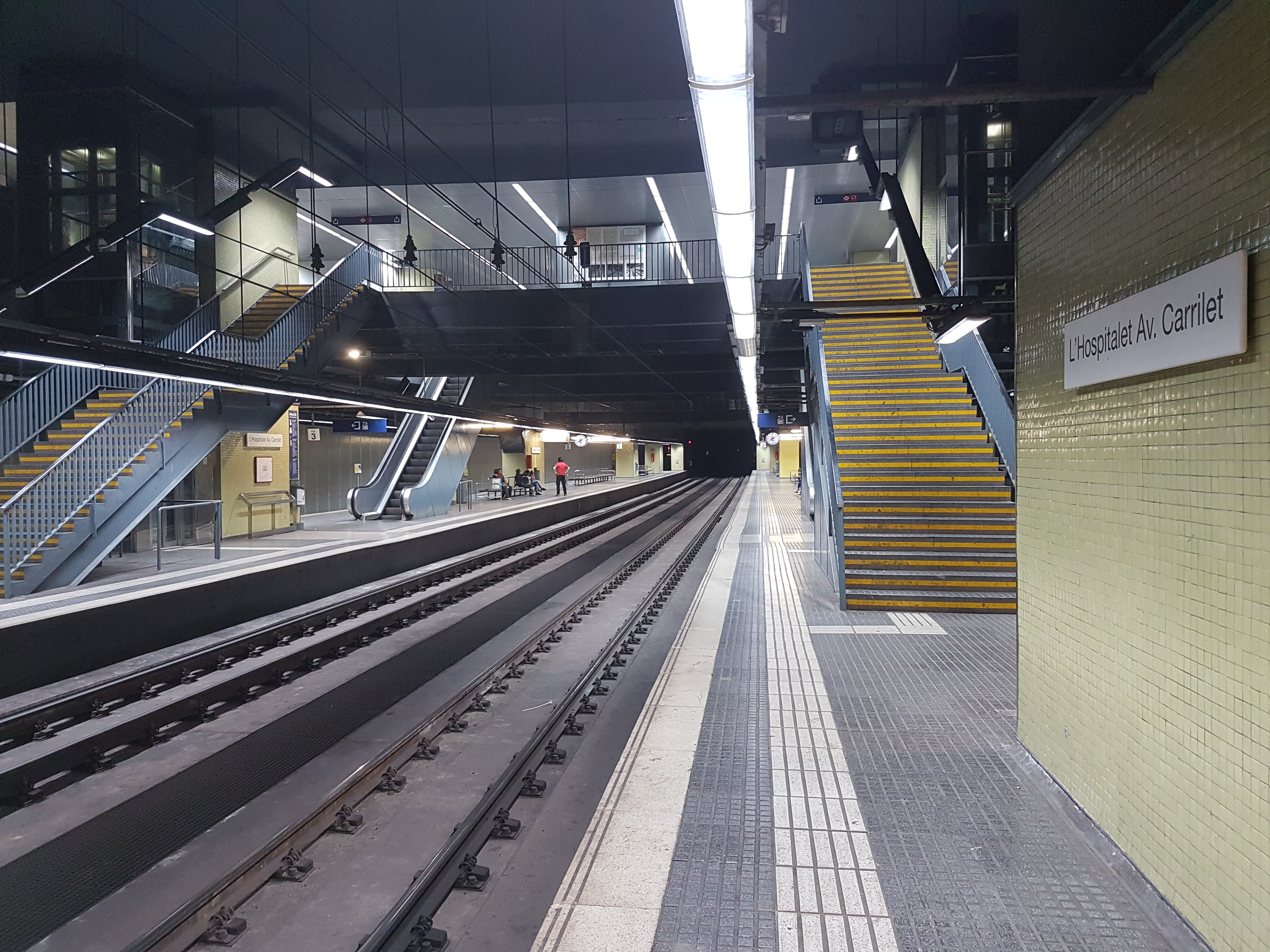
A picture of the Llobregat-Anoia line's platforms, with the old station signage

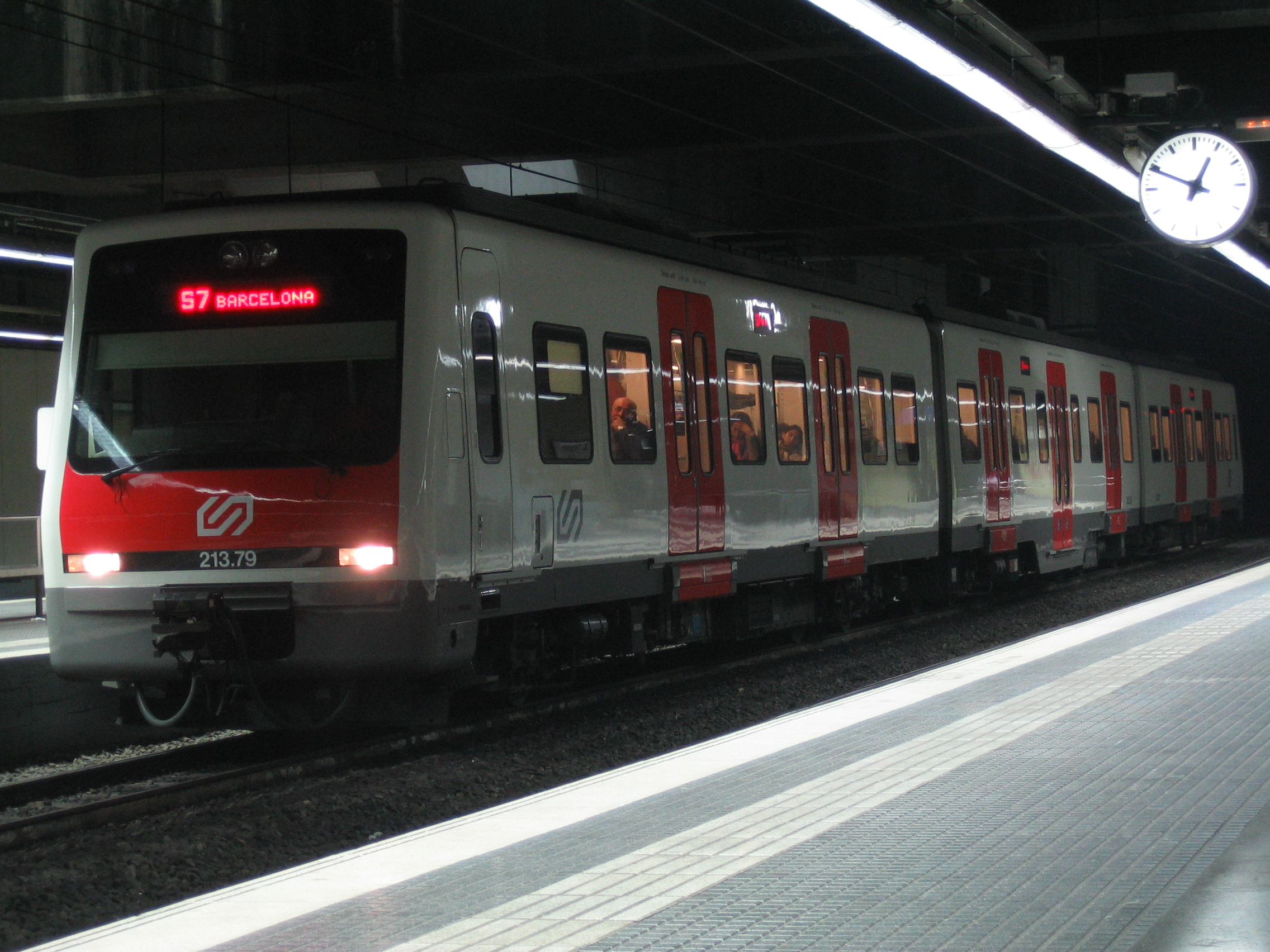
A FGC 213 Series train at the station
