= Almeda station =

Metro station in Barcelona, Spain

Coordinates: 41°21′11″N 2°5′7″E

Almeda
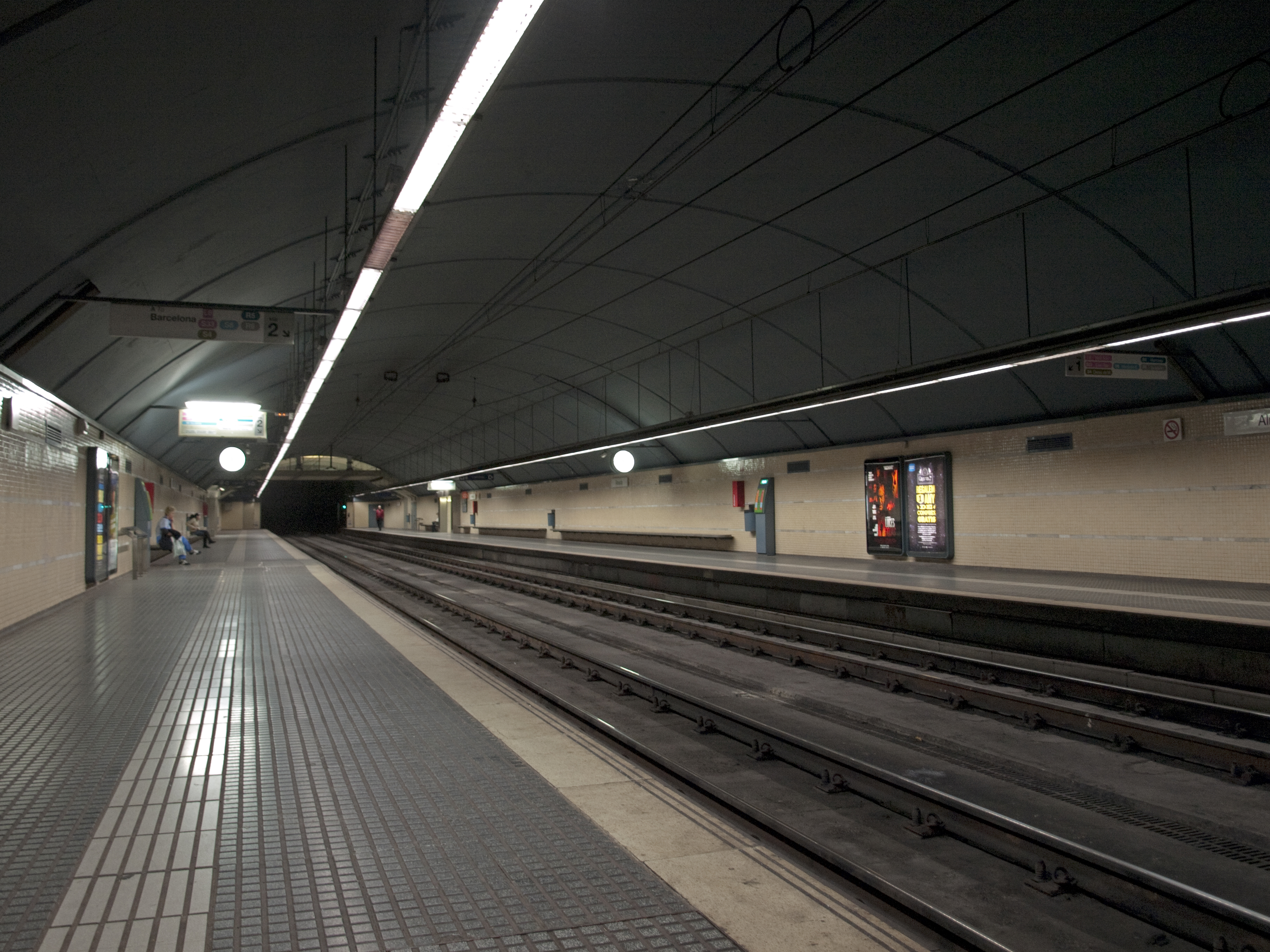
- The station's platforms level in 2012

General information
- Line: Llobregat–Anoia Line
- Platforms: 2 side platforms
- Tracks: 2

Construction
- Structure type: Underground

History
- Opened: 9 July 1985

Services
Preceding station	FGC	Following station
Cornellà Riera towards Molí Nou-Ciutat Cooperativa	L8	L'Hospitalet Av. Carrilet towards Barcelona Pl. Espanya
Cornellà Riera towards Can Ros	S33	L'Hospitalet Av. Carrilet towards Barcelona Pl. Espanya
Cornellà Riera towards Olesa de Montserrat	S4	L'Hospitalet Av. Carrilet towards Barcelona Pl. Espanya
Cornellà Riera towards Martorell Enllaç	S8	L'Hospitalet Av. Carrilet towards Barcelona Pl. Espanya
Cornellà Riera towards Manresa Baixador	R5	L'Hospitalet Av. Carrilet towards Barcelona Pl. Espanya
Cornellà Riera towards Igualada	R6	L'Hospitalet Av. Carrilet towards Barcelona Pl. Espanya
Cornellà Riera towards Manresa Baixador	R50	L'Hospitalet Av. Carrilet towards Barcelona Pl. Espanya
Cornellà Riera towards Igualada	R60	L'Hospitalet Av. Carrilet towards Barcelona Pl. Espanya

Almeda is a railway station on the Llobregat–Anoia Line. It is located underneath Passeig dels Ferrocarrils Catalans, between Carrer de Dolors Almeda Roig and Carrer del Vallès, in the Cornellà de Llobregat municipality, to the south-west of Barcelona, in Catalonia, Spain. It is served by Barcelona Metro line 8, Baix Llobregat Metro lines S33, S4 and S8, and commuter rail lines R5, R6, R50 and R60.

The current underground station was opened on 9 July 1985, when the line's section between Sant Josep and Cornellà stations was put underground. Before then, the station was at-grade. It has two side platforms and two entrances from street level. The eastern exit leads to the east of Carrer de Sant Ferran and starts from the eastern ends of the platforms (towards Cornellà Riera); the western exit starts from the middle of the platforms and leads to the west of Carrer de Sant Ferran. The western exit was opened in 2006.
