= Europa/Fira station =

Railway station in Barcelona, Spain

Europa | Fira
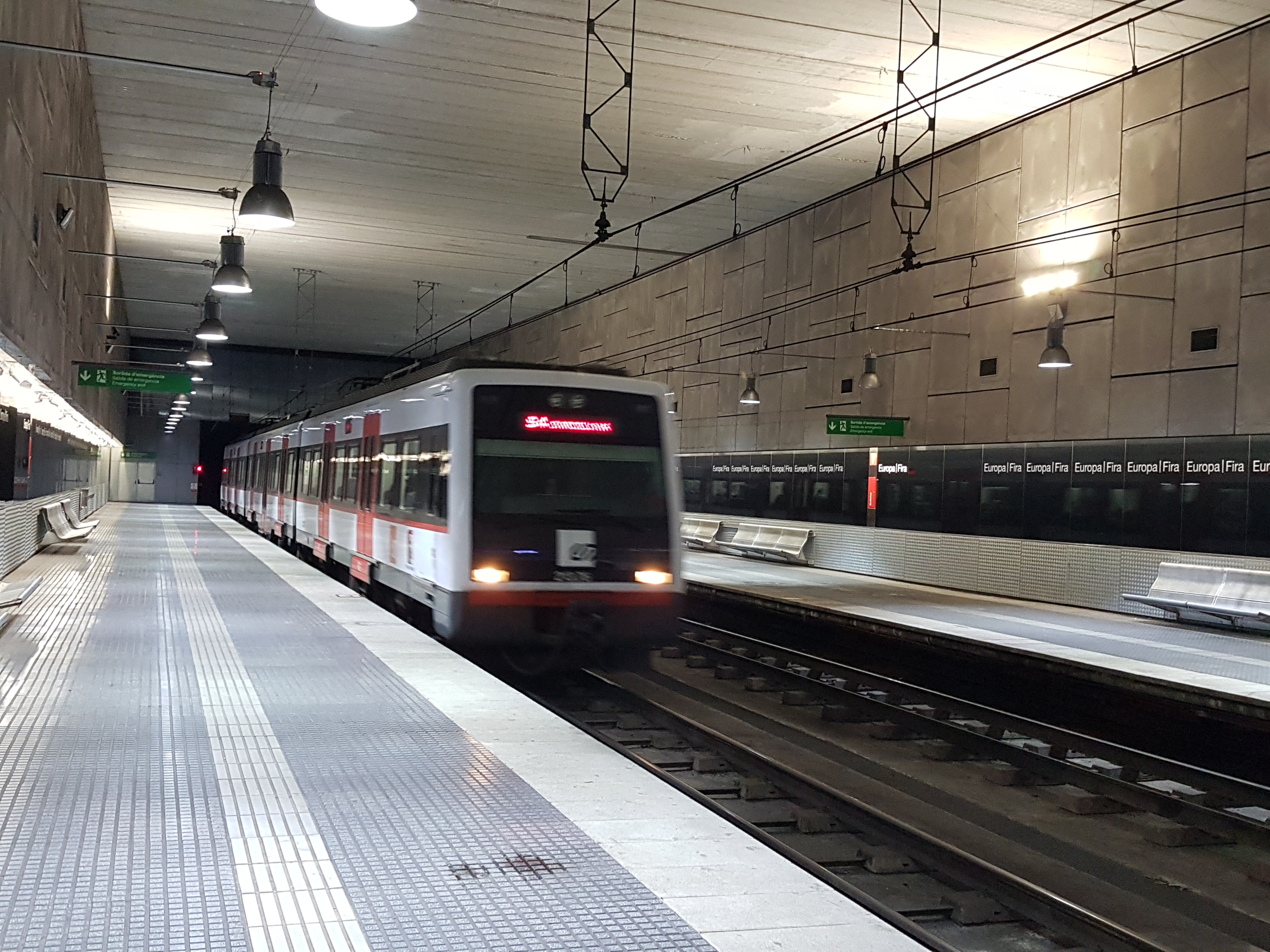
- View of the FGC platforms

General information
- Location: L'Hospitalet de Llobregat (Santa Eulàlia)
- Coordinates: 41°21′25″N 2°07′29″E
- System: FGC rapid transit station Barcelona Metro rapid transit station
- Owner: TMB and FGC
- Operator: TMB and FGC
- Platforms: 2 side platforms (Llobregat–Anoia Line); 2 split platforms (Barcelona Metro line 9)
- Tracks: 2 (Llobregat–Anoia Line); 2 (Barcelona Metro line 9)
- Connections: Local and interurban buses

Construction
- Structure type: Underground
- Accessible: Yes

Other information
- Fare zone: 1 (ATM)

History
- Opened: 13 May 2007 (Llobregat–Anoia Line); 12 February 2016 (Line 9)

Services
Preceding station	FGC	Following station
Gornal towards Molí Nou-Ciutat Cooperativa	L8	Ildefons Cerdà towards Barcelona Pl. Espanya
Gornal towards Can Ros	S33	Ildefons Cerdà towards Barcelona Pl. Espanya
Gornal towards Olesa de Montserrat	S4	Ildefons Cerdà towards Barcelona Pl. Espanya
Gornal towards Martorell Enllaç	S8	Ildefons Cerdà towards Barcelona Pl. Espanya
Terminus	R5	Ildefons Cerdà towards Barcelona Pl. Espanya
Terminus	R6	Ildefons Cerdà towards Barcelona Pl. Espanya
Gornal towards Manresa Baixador	R50	Ildefons Cerdà towards Barcelona Pl. Espanya
Gornal towards Igualada	R60	Ildefons Cerdà towards Barcelona Pl. Espanya
Preceding station	Metro	Following station
Fira towards Aeroport T1	L9 Sud	Can Tries | Gornal towards Zona Universitària
Projected
Fira towards Aeroport T1	L9	Can Tries | Gornal towards Can Zam
Location

Europa | Fira (Catalan pronunciation: [əwˈɾopə ˈfiɾə]) is a rapid transit station in L'Hospitalet de Llobregat. Located in the Plaça d'Europa and in proximity to the Fira de Barcelona venues in L'Hospitalet, it is an interchange station of the Barcelona Metro and the FGC commuter lines. The station serves as the main transport hub for the Granvia l'Hospitalet district.

Europa | Fira is served by Line 8 and Line 9 of the Barcelona Metro and by the suburban rail lines of the Llobregat-Anoia Line.

== Location ==
The station is located in the Plaça d'Europa of L'Hospitalet de Llobregat, in the neighborhood of Santa Eulàlia. As the other stations of the Llobregat-Anoia Line towards its terminus in Espanya, the station is located on the Gran Via de les Corts Catalanes axis. A long underground hall, with an entrance on each side of the Gran Via, allows connection between the FGC and the TMB stations.

The FGC station features a single entrance hall with fare gates on the Espanya side of the platforms. The TMB station's platforms are stacked on top of each other, as other stations on Line 9.

== History ==
Europa | Fira first opened as an infill station on the Llobregat-Anoia Line on 13 May 2007. The line's underground tunnel already crossed the Plaça d'Europa since 1987. The station was opened to serve the new urban developments and commercial zone then being created in that area of L'Hospitalet de Llobregat. The station was also named after the nearby venues of the Fira de Barcelona in Hospitalet.

On 12 February 2016, the Line 9 station was opened along with the rest of the line's southern branch. The station was designed by Japanese architect Toyo Ito, who designed iconic buildings in the Plaça d'Europa such as the Hotel Porta Fira and the Torre Realia BCN.

== Gallery ==
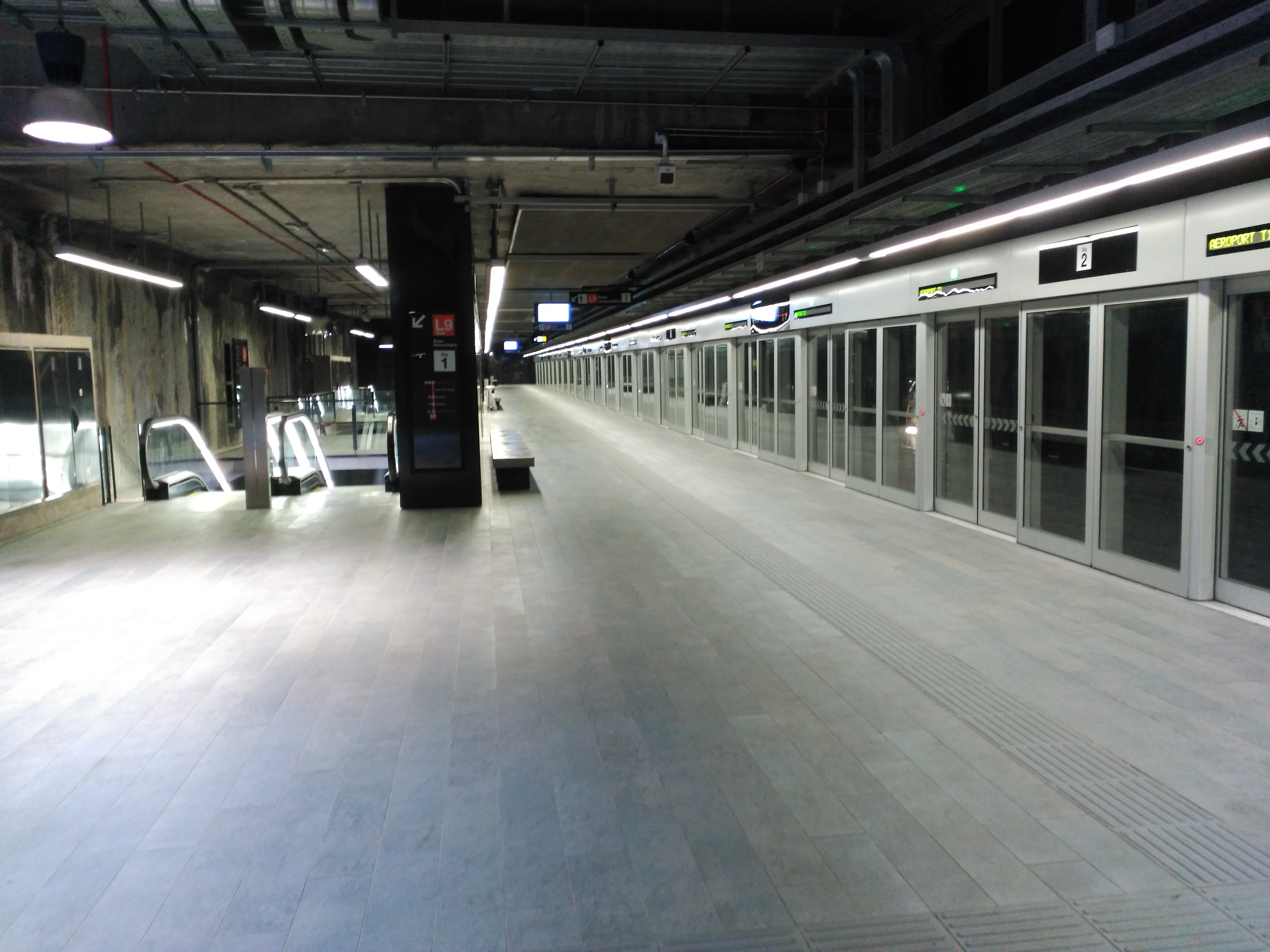
View of the upper Line 9 platform

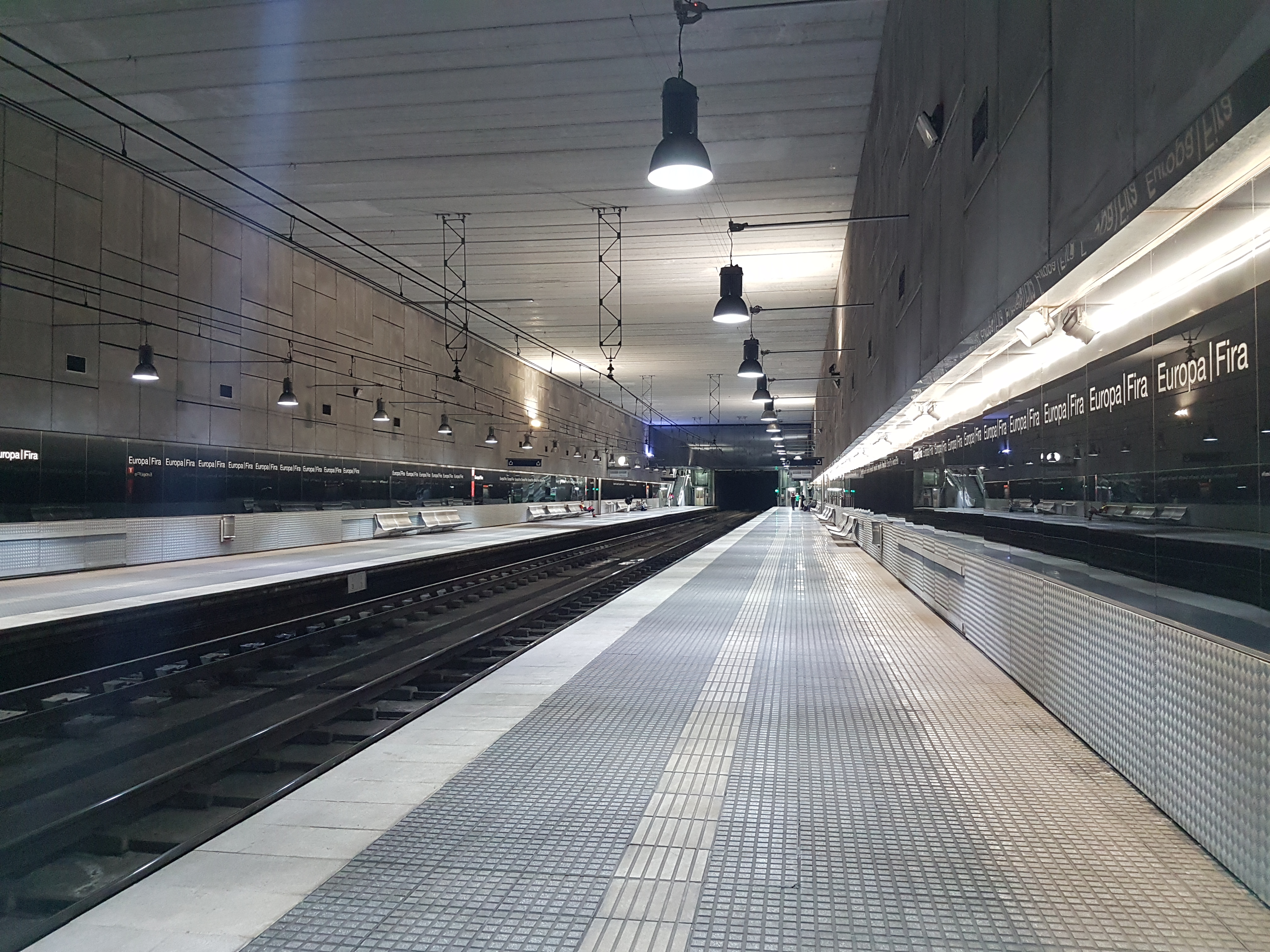
Another view of the FGC station's platforms

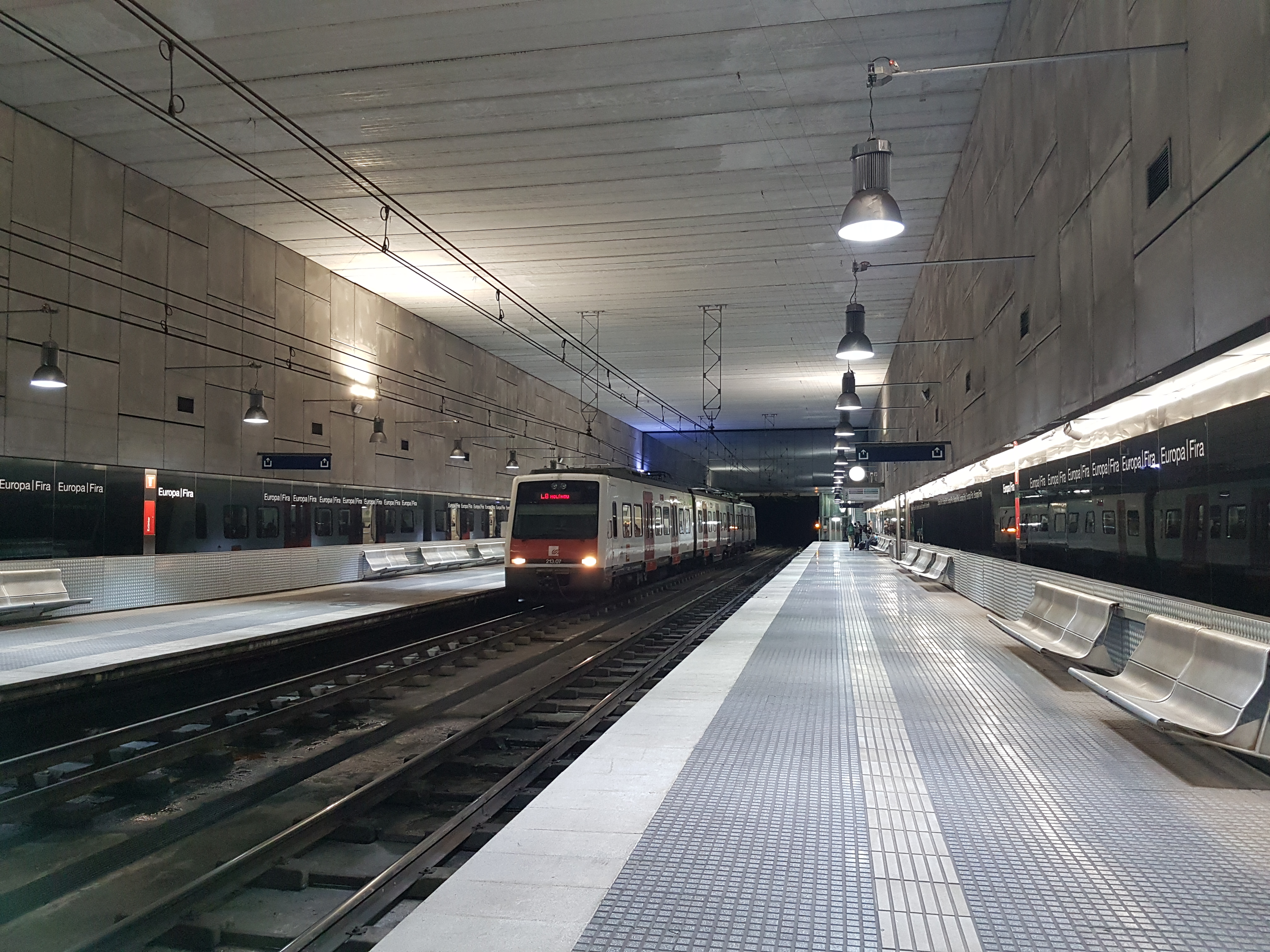
An FGC 213 Series train at the station

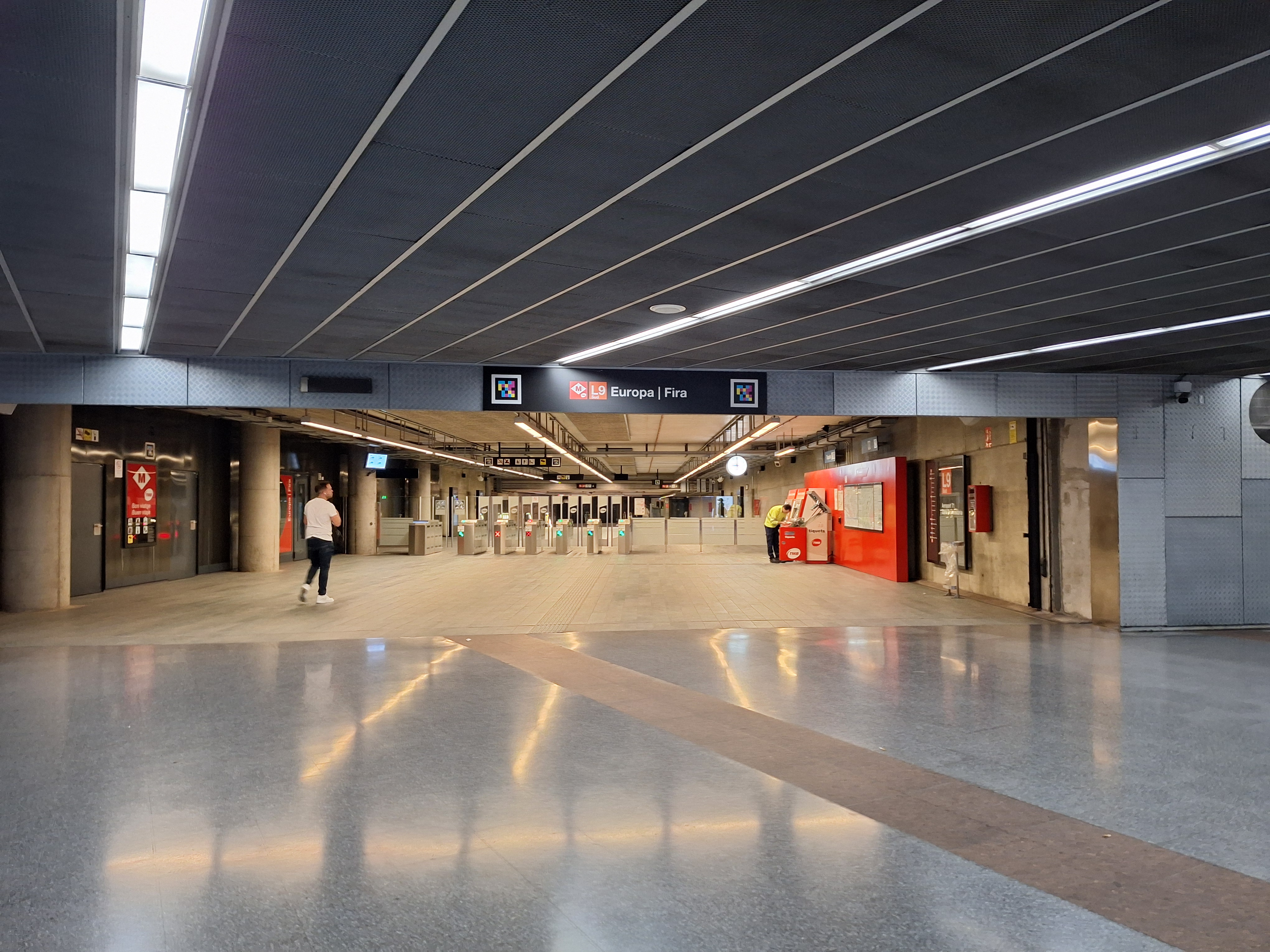
The station's connection hall

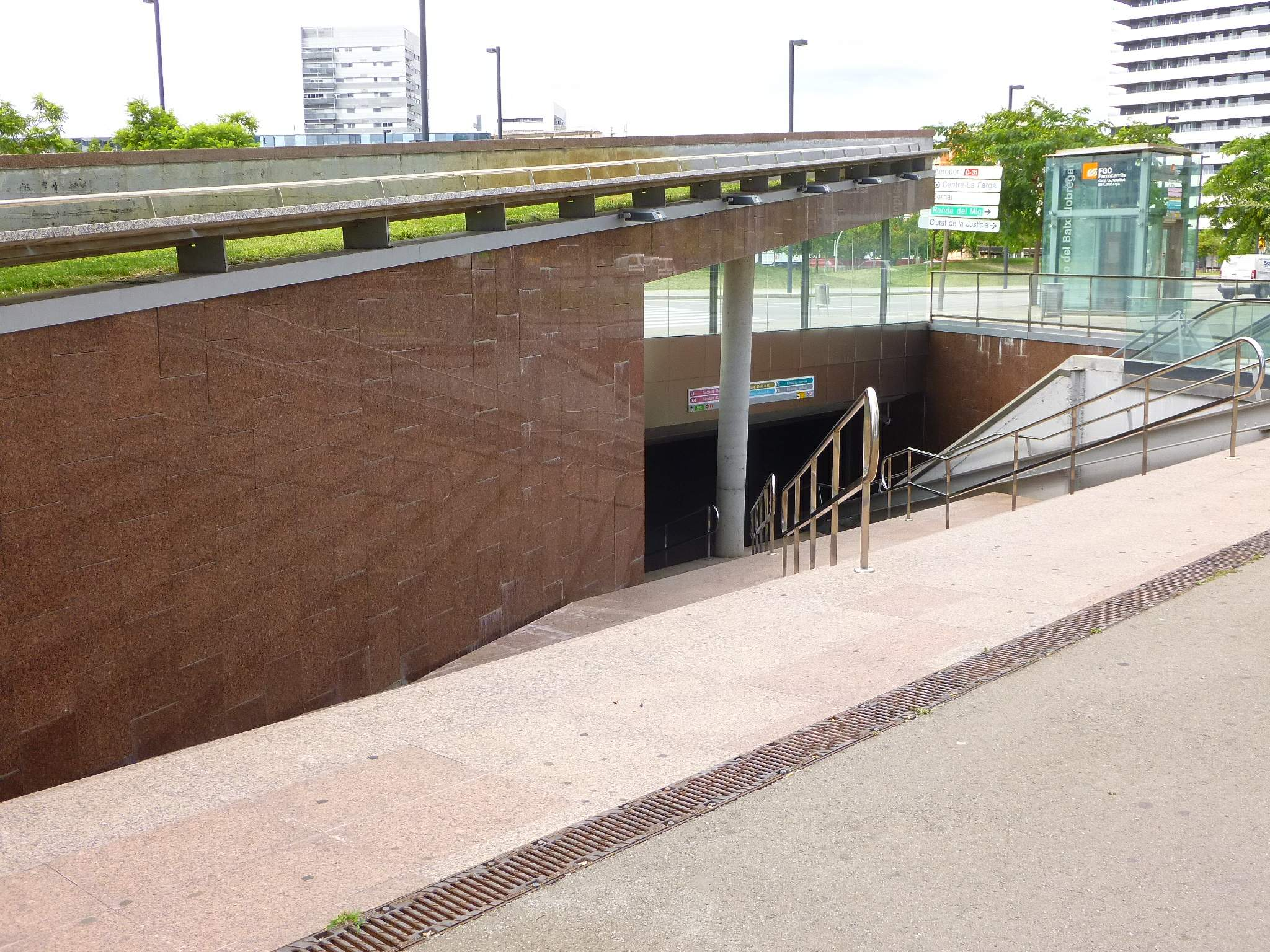
One of the station's accesses at Plaça d'Europa

== See also ==
- Fira de Barcelona
- Gran Via (Barcelona)
- Granvia l'Hospitalet
- Transport in L'Hospitalet de Llobregat
