= Gornal station =

Metro station in Barcelona, Spain

Gornal
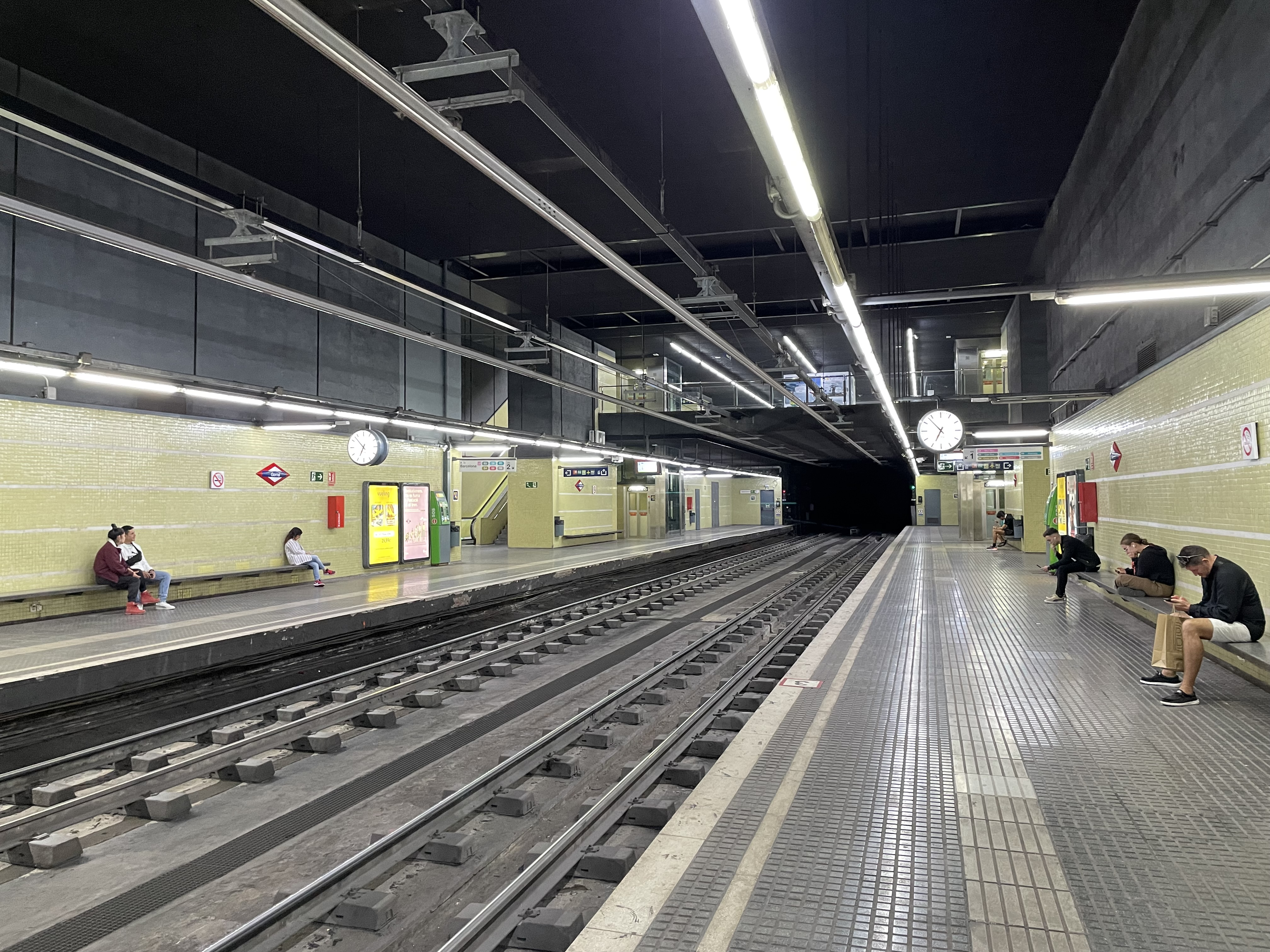
- View of the station's platforms

General information
- Location: L'Hospitalet de Llobregat (Gornal)
- Coordinates: 41°21′17.6″N 2°07′02.7″E
- System: FGC rapid transit station
- Owner: FGC
- Operator: FGC
- Connections: : at Bellvitge

Construction
- Structure type: Underground
- Accessible: Yes

Other information
- Fare zone: 1 (ATM)

History
- Opened: 1987

Services
Preceding station	FGC	Following station
Sant Josep towards Molí Nou-Ciutat Cooperativa	L8	Europa | Fira towards Barcelona Pl. Espanya
Sant Josep towards Can Ros	S33	Europa | Fira towards Barcelona Pl. Espanya
Sant Josep towards Olesa de Montserrat	S4	Europa | Fira towards Barcelona Pl. Espanya
Sant Josep towards Martorell Enllaç	S8	Europa | Fira towards Barcelona Pl. Espanya
Sant Josep towards Manresa Baixador	R5	Europa | Fira towards Barcelona Pl. Espanya
Sant Josep towards Igualada	R6	Europa | Fira towards Barcelona Pl. Espanya
Sant Josep towards Manresa Baixador	R50	Europa | Fira towards Barcelona Pl. Espanya
Sant Josep towards Igualada	R60	Europa | Fira towards Barcelona Pl. Espanya
Location

Gornal is a rapid transit station on the Llobregat-Anoia Line. Located between the neighborhoods of Bellvitge and Gornal of L'Hospitalet de Llobregat, it is served by the FGC-operated Line 8 of the Barcelona Metro and several suburban rail services of the Llobregat-Anoia Line.

The station is adjacent to Bellvitge, a railway station served by Rodalies de Catalunya.

== Location ==
The station's underground platforms are located under the Avinguda de Carmen Amaya, in the Gornal neighborhood of L'Hospitalet de Llobregat. The nearby Bellvitge neighborhood is located on the other side of the mainline rail tracks. The station features a single entrance hall with fare gates on the Espanya side of the platforms. The access to the Bellvitge station is about 85 meters away.

== History ==
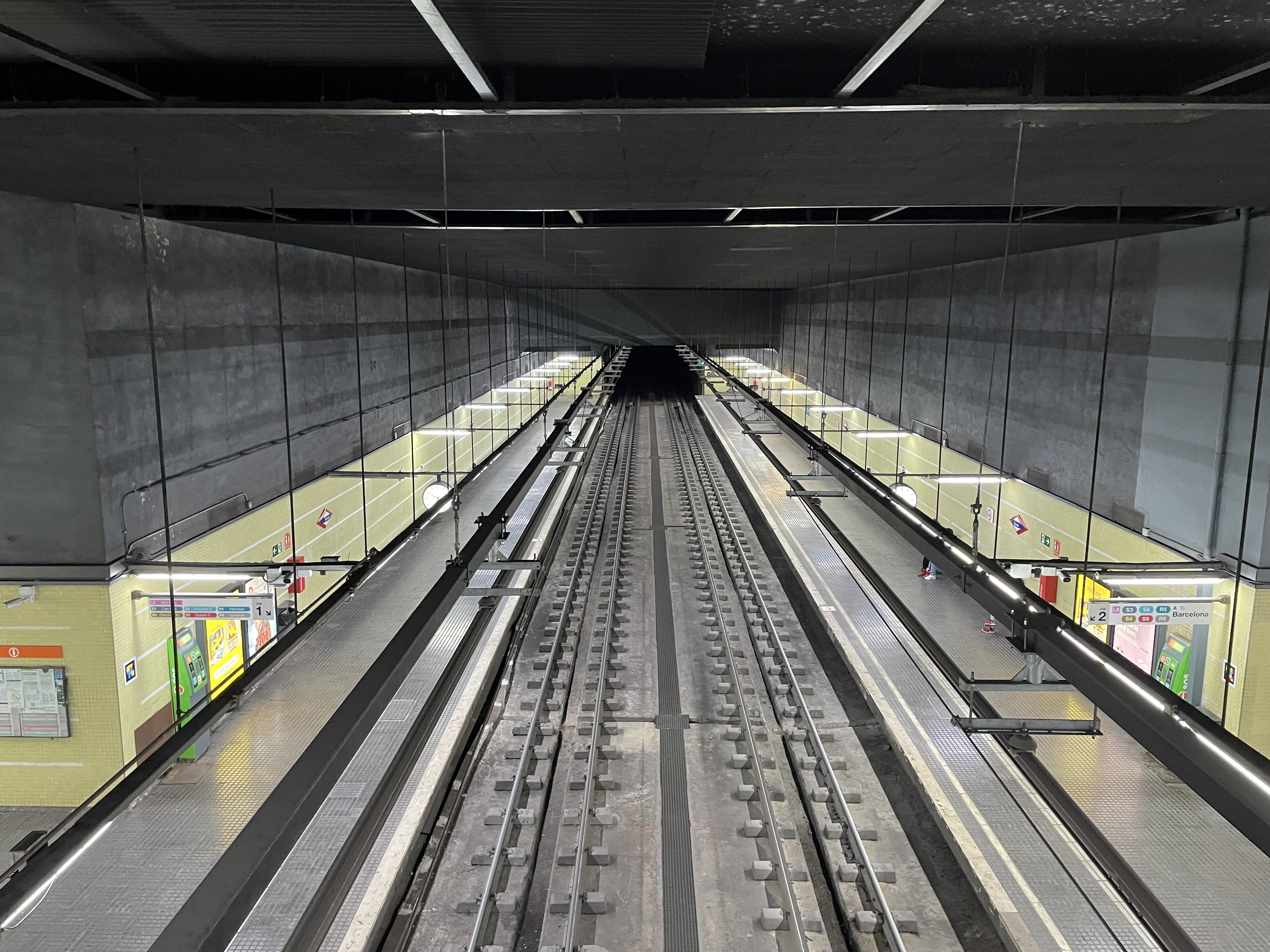
Another view of the station's platforms

Gornal entered operation on March 2, 1987, with the inauguration of the new underground layout of the Llobregat-Anoia Line between the stations of Sant Josep and Espanya. The inauguration was attended by the President of Catalonia at the time, Jordi Pujol.

In 2007, the station was temporarily closed after the underground structure of the Llobregat-Anoia Line was affected by the construction works of the Madrid–Barcelona high-speed rail line. The works caused a sink hole in the Gornal neighborhood.
