= Cornellà Riera station =

Railway station in Catalonia, Spain

Coordinates: 41°21′05″N 2°04′15″E

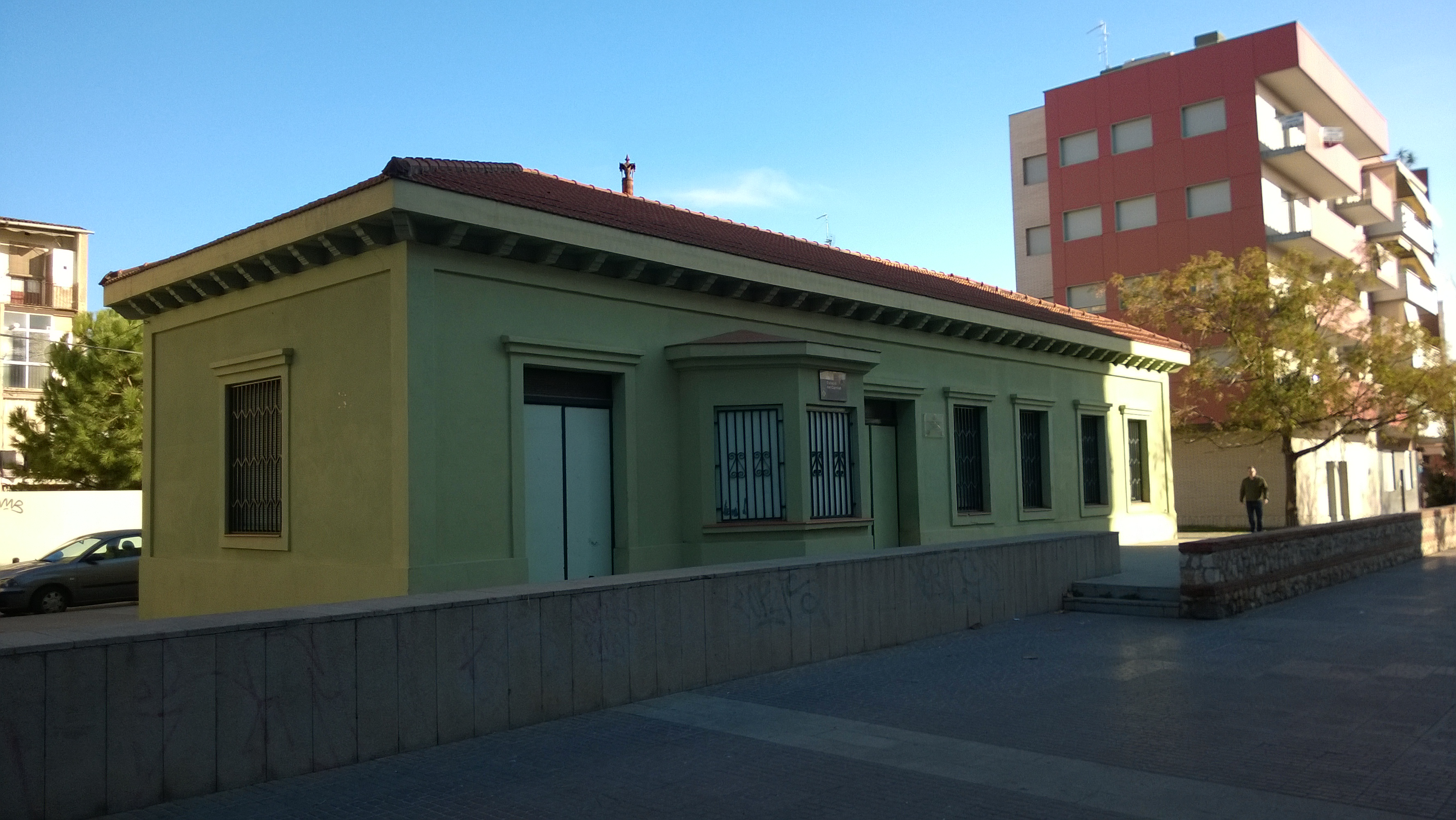
The original at-grade station building in 2014, still preserved.

Cornellà Riera is a railway station on the Llobregat–Anoia Line. It is located underneath Passeig dels Ferrocarrils Catalans, in the Cornellà de Llobregat municipality, to the south-west of Barcelona, in Catalonia, Spain. It is served by Barcelona Metro line 8, Baix Llobregat Metro lines S33, S4 and S8, and commuter rail lines R5, R6, R50 and R60.

The station was opened in 1985, when the line's section between Sant Josep and Cornellà Riera stations was put underground. The original at-grade station dates from 1912, and the current underground station is more or less situated underneath it.

Cornellà Riera serves as the main public transport access to RCD Espanyol's Cornellà-El Prat Stadium.

Preceding station	FGC	Following station
Sant Boi towards Molí Nou-Ciutat Cooperativa	L8	Almeda towards Barcelona Pl. Espanya
Sant Boi towards Can Ros	S33	Almeda towards Barcelona Pl. Espanya
Sant Boi towards Olesa de Montserrat	S4	Almeda towards Barcelona Pl. Espanya
Sant Boi towards Martorell Enllaç	S8	Almeda towards Barcelona Pl. Espanya
Sant Boi towards Manresa Baixador	R5	Almeda towards Barcelona Pl. Espanya
Sant Boi towards Igualada	R6	Almeda towards Barcelona Pl. Espanya
Sant Boi towards Manresa Baixador	R50	Almeda towards Barcelona Pl. Espanya
Sant Boi towards Igualada	R60	Almeda towards Barcelona Pl. Espanya
