= Silvia Oliete =

Spanish entrepreneur and communicator

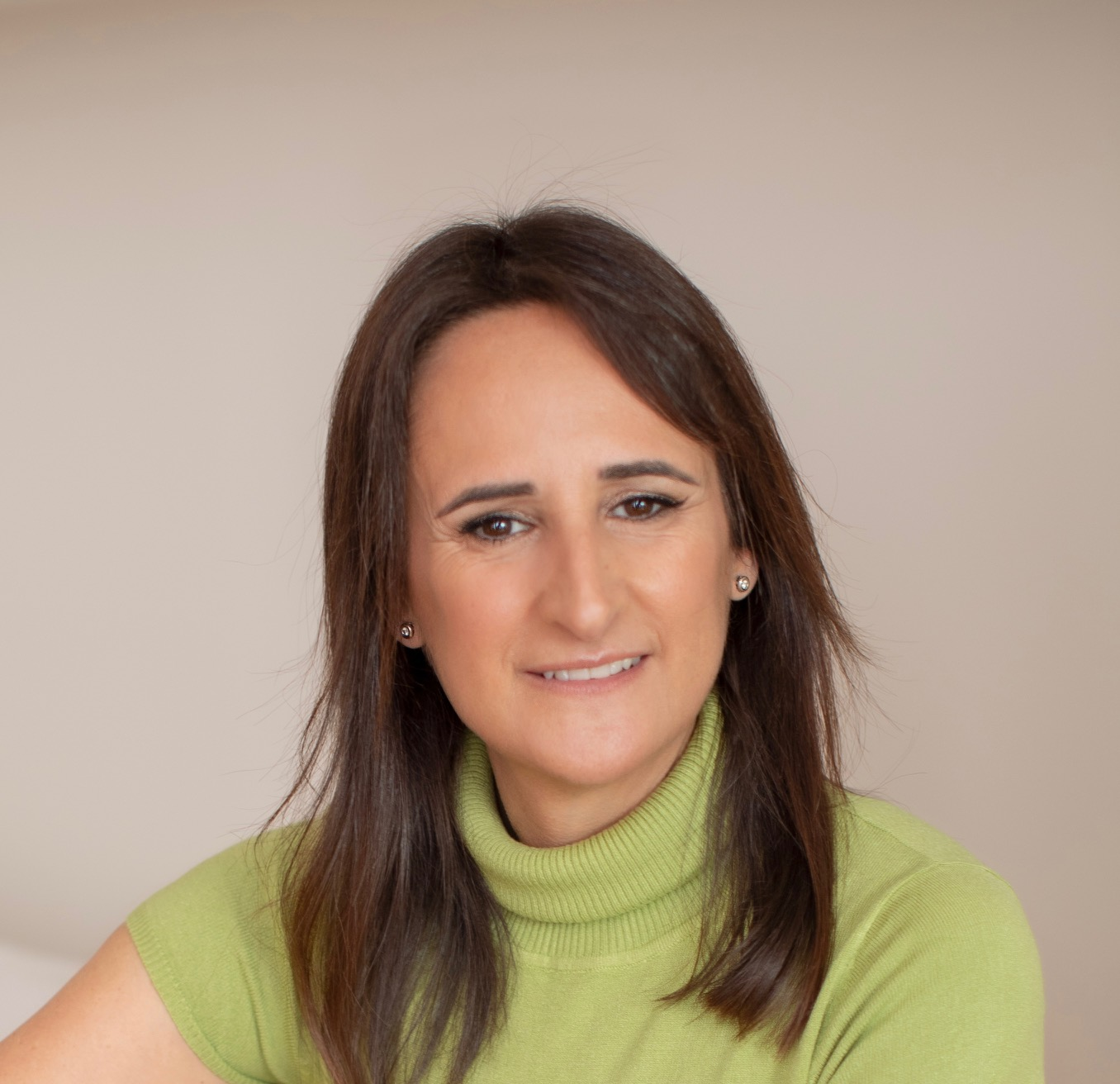
- Silvia Oliete in 2024
- Born: 1971 (age 54–55); Barcelona, Spain
- Years active: 1992–present
- Organization: Blauceldona
- Awards: Vida Estetica Award, 2015, 2023
- Website: https://blauceldona.com/

Silvia Oliete (born 1971 in Barcelona) is a Spanish entrepreneur and communicator specializing in the beauty industry creator of the cosmetics firm SO, and the beauty and esthetics school Instituto Silvia Oliete.

== Professional career ==
When she was 23 years old, she opened her first center in Barcelona, called Blauceldona. In 2015, after its remodeling and redesign, it received the Hit Salon de Vida Estética award at Cosmobeauty (Fira Barcelona).

In 2018 she created a space for outreach and education in aesthetics and nutrition, and in 2020 she opened her center at the Mandarin Hotel. Mandarin Hotel.

On the pandemic, on Instagram and TikTok, she broadcasts videos with tricks on face and body care that go viral.

In 2021, she entered the field of hyaluronic acid-based beauty products, creating her own brand, SO. In 2023, she won again the Vida Estética award in the category of signature cosmetics.

Judith Martínez (2023, Zanilo Editorial) tells the story of her life as an entrepreneur and beautician in her book Destino Belleza.
