= Sant Josep =

Sant Josep (Catalan for Saint Joseph) may refer to:

- CB Sant Josep, basketball team based in Girona, Catalonia, Spain
- Sant Josep, railway station on the Llobregat–Anoia Line
- Sant Josep de sa Talaia, village in the Balearic Islands
