= Sant Boi station =

Coordinates: 41°20′53″N 2°02′36″E

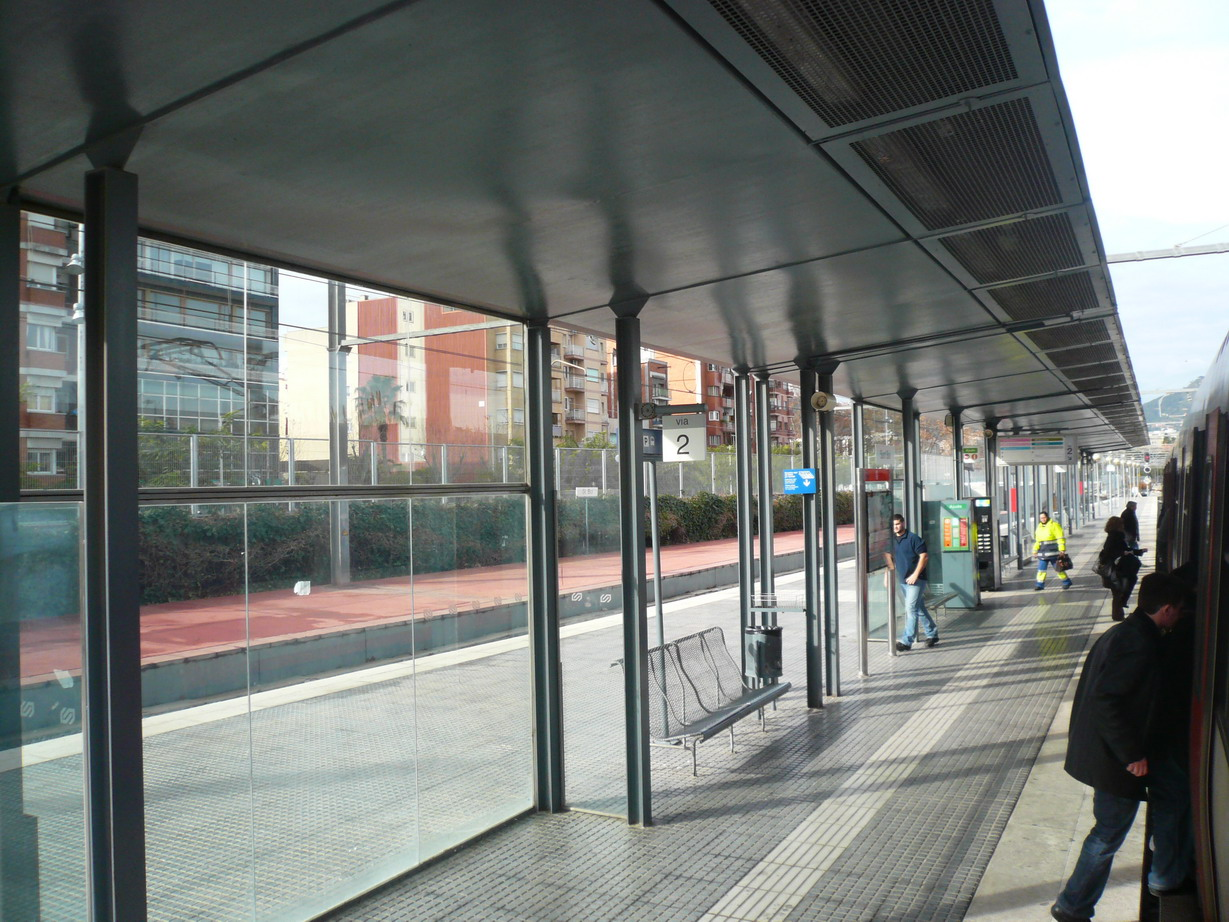
View of the station's island platform in 2009.

Sant Boi is a railway station on the Llobregat–Anoia Line. It is located in the municipality of Sant Boi de Llobregat, to the south-west of Barcelona, in Catalonia, Spain. It was opened in 1912 together with the rest of the line's section between Barcelona and Martorell. It is served by Barcelona Metro line 8, Baix Llobregat Metro lines S33, S4 and S8, and commuter rail lines R5, R6, R50 and R60.

Preceding station	FGC	Following station
Molí Nou-Ciutat Cooperativa Terminus	L8	Cornellà Riera towards Barcelona Pl. Espanya
Molí Nou-Ciutat Cooperativa towards Can Ros	S33	Cornellà Riera towards Barcelona Pl. Espanya
Molí Nou-Ciutat Cooperativa towards Olesa de Montserrat	S4	Cornellà Riera towards Barcelona Pl. Espanya
Molí Nou-Ciutat Cooperativa towards Martorell Enllaç	S8	Cornellà Riera towards Barcelona Pl. Espanya
Molí Nou-Ciutat Cooperativa towards Manresa Baixador	R5	Cornellà Riera towards Barcelona Pl. Espanya
Molí Nou-Ciutat Cooperativa towards Igualada	R6	Cornellà Riera towards Barcelona Pl. Espanya
Sant Vicenç dels Horts towards Manresa Baixador	R50	Cornellà Riera towards Barcelona Pl. Espanya
Santa Coloma de Cervelló towards Igualada	R60	Cornellà Riera towards Barcelona Pl. Espanya
