= RCDE Stadium =

Stadium in Barcelona, Spain

- Cornellà-El Prat
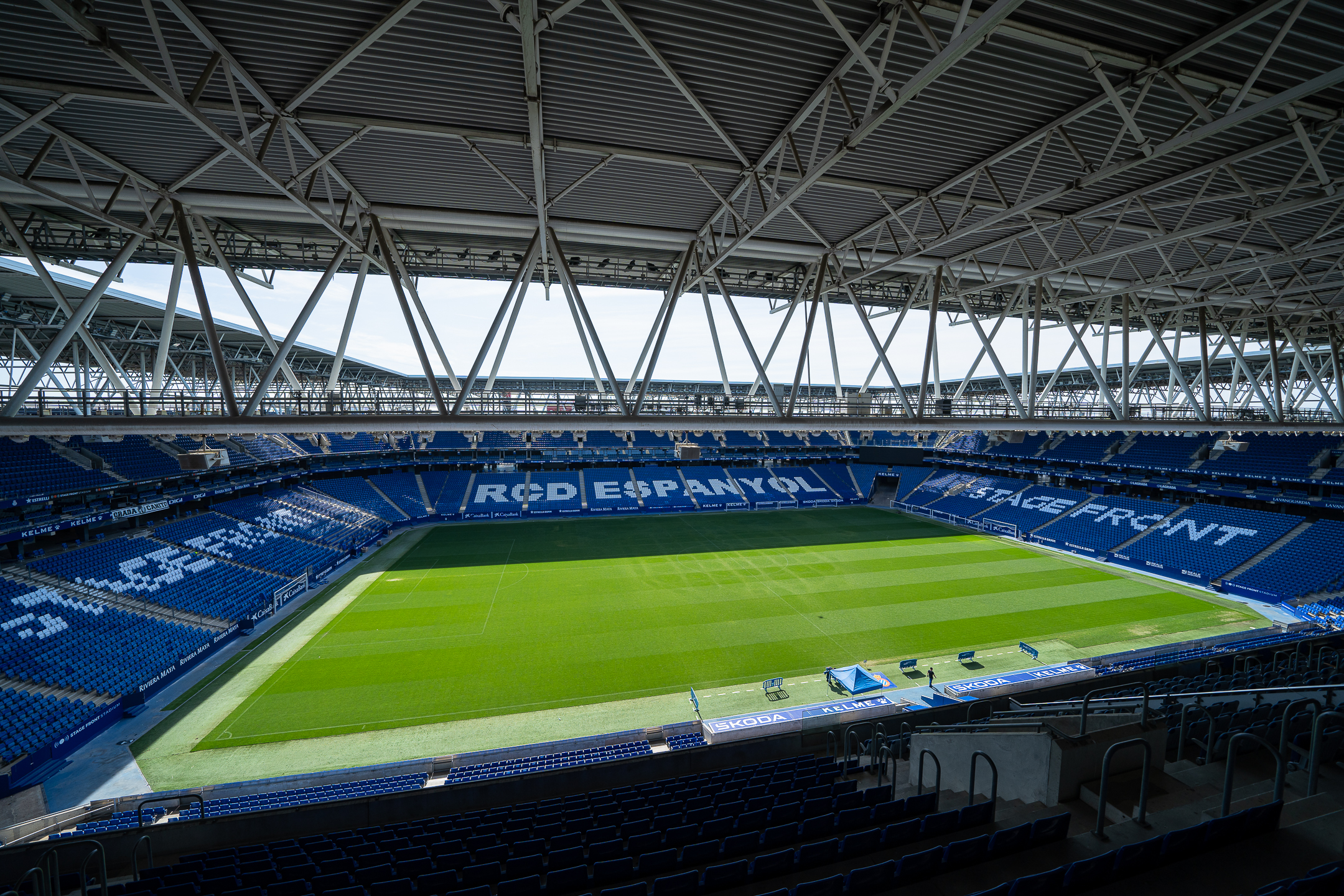
- UEFA
- Interactive map of RCDE Stadium
- Full name: RCDE Stadium
- Former names: Cornellà-El Prat (2009–2014); Power8 Stadium (2014–2016); RCDE Stadium (2016–2023, 2024–present); Stage Front Stadium (2023–2024)
- Location: Cornellà and El Prat, Barcelona, Spain
- Coordinates: 41°20′52″N 2°4′32″E
- Owner: Espanyol
- Operator: Espanyol
- Capacity: 40,500
- Executive suites: 44
- Surface: Grass
- Record attendance: 40,240 (Espanyol vs Real Madrid; 13 February 2011)
- Field size: 105 m × 68 m (344 ft × 223 ft)
- Public transit: Cornellà Riera

Construction
- Groundbreaking: 9 May 2003
- Built: 9 May 2005
- Opened: 2 August 2009
- Cost: €60 million
- Architects: Mark Fenwick, Javier Iribarren (Reid Fenwick Asociados) and Esteban Gasulla (Gasulla Arquitectura y Gestió)
- Project manager: Jacques Coltard
- Structural engineer: Indus
- Services engineer: PGI Group
- General contractor: FCC Construcción i Copisa

Tenants
- Espanyol (2009–present); Cornellà (2022–present); Spain national football team (selected matches)

Website
- www.rcdestadium.com

RCDE Stadium, also known as Estadi Cornellà-El Prat (Catalan pronunciation: [əsˈtaði kuɾnəˈʎa əl ˈpɾat]; Spanish: Estadio Cornellà-El Prat [esˈtaðjo koɾneˈʎa el ˈpɾat]), is an all-seater football stadium owned by the Spanish football club RCD Espanyol on the outskirts of Cornellà de Llobregat and El Prat de Llobregat, in the wider Barcelona urban area. It took three years to build and cost approximately €60 million. Opened in August 2009, it was awarded as Venue of the Year at the Stadium Business Awards on 18 June 2010 in Dublin.

With a capacity of 40,500 seats, it is the tenth-largest stadium in Spain and the third-largest in Catalonia. It became the home of RCD Espanyol in 2009, replacing their previous stadium, the Estadi Olímpic Lluís Companys, being the eighth stadium in the club's history.

It is one of the potential host stadiums for the 2030 FIFA World Cup.

== History ==
The stadium is known as the Estadi Cornellà-El Prat because it is located on the borders of the municipalities Cornellà and El Prat. The club hopes to find a buyer for the naming rights for the stadium.

Espanyol defeated Liverpool 3–0 in the stadium's inaugural match on 2 August 2009.

After the death of club captain Daniel Jarque on 8 August 2009, just six days after the inaugural match, it was proposed that the stadium should be renamed in his honour. However, the club has not taken a definite stance on the subject.

In July 2014, the stadium was renamed as the Power8 Stadium for sponsorship reasons. It was discovered that Power8 was an investment fraud which duped hundreds of Asian investors, organised by Bryan Cook and Thomas Yi of London Capital. In January 2016, the club renamed the stadium as RCDE Stadium ending the sponsorship of Power8.

In June 2023, Espanyol and American ticketing technology company Stage Front reached a sponsorship agreement to rename the Espanyol Stadium as the Stage Front Stadium. On 1 July 2024, the stadium was renamed back to RCDE Stadium due to termination of the service contract.

== Other uses ==
On 3 July 2010, the stadium held a live concert of American hip hop group The Black Eyed Peas, during The E.N.D World Tour, in front of 30,000 fans.

On 1 June 2019, German metal band Rammstein performed at the stadium as part of their Europe Stadium Tour 2019 with 33,825 fans in attendance.

On 5 July 2025, British English pop singer Robbie Williams performed at the stadium as part of his 2025 tour.

On 7 June 2025, Andorra hosted England for the qualifiers of the 2026 FIFA World Cup.

== Gallery ==
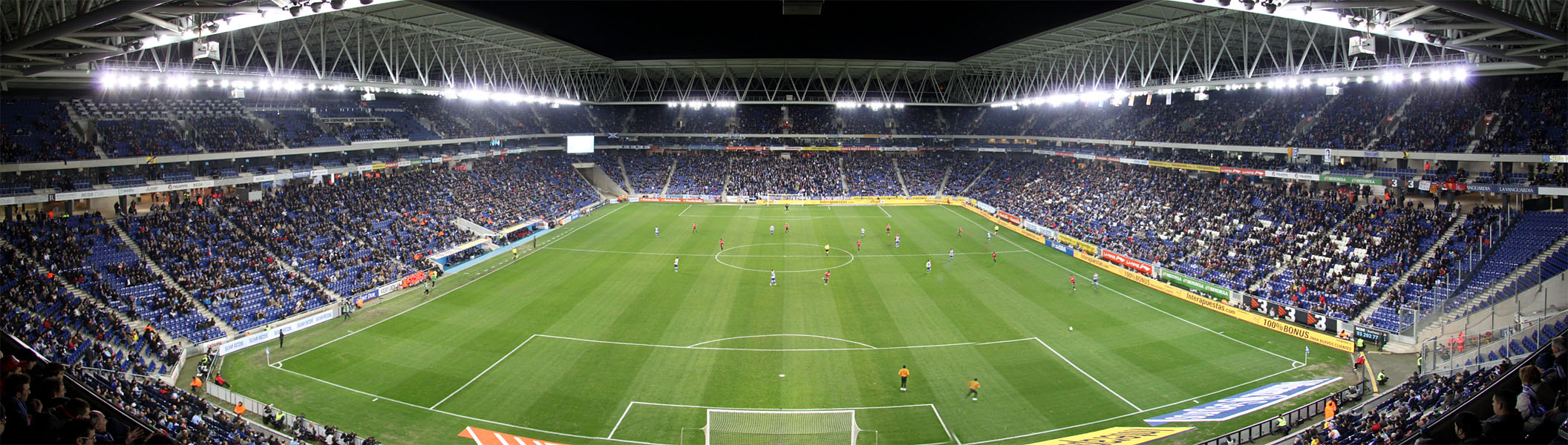

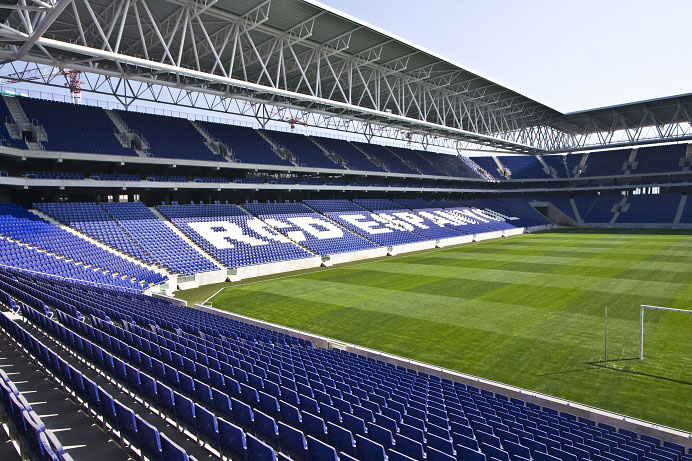

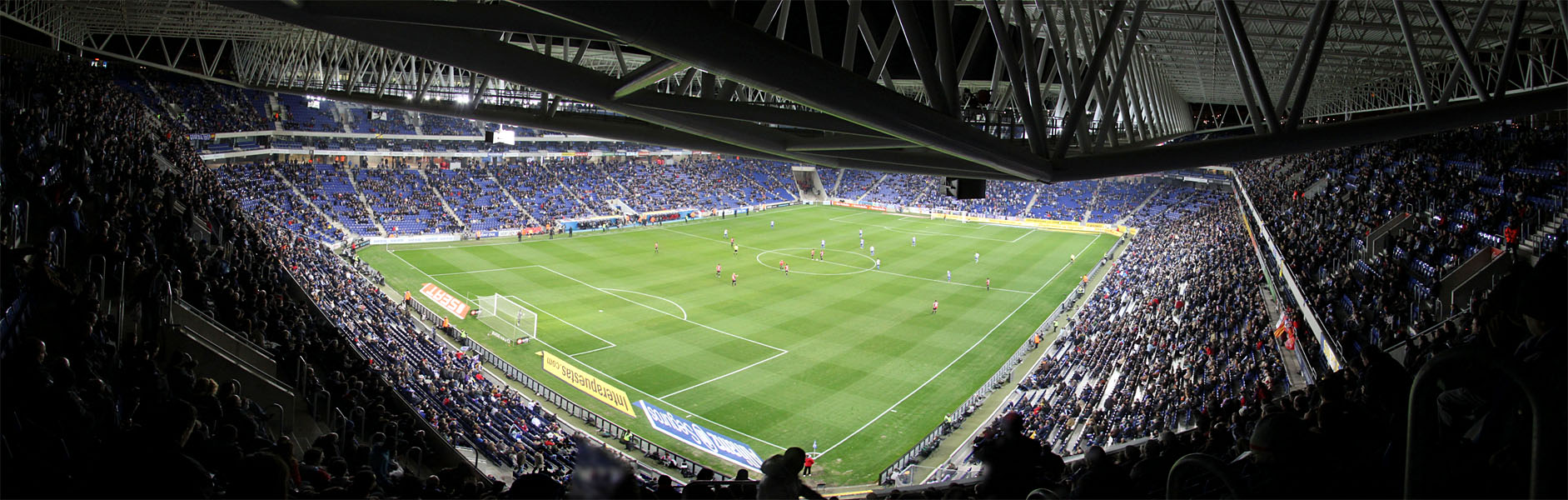

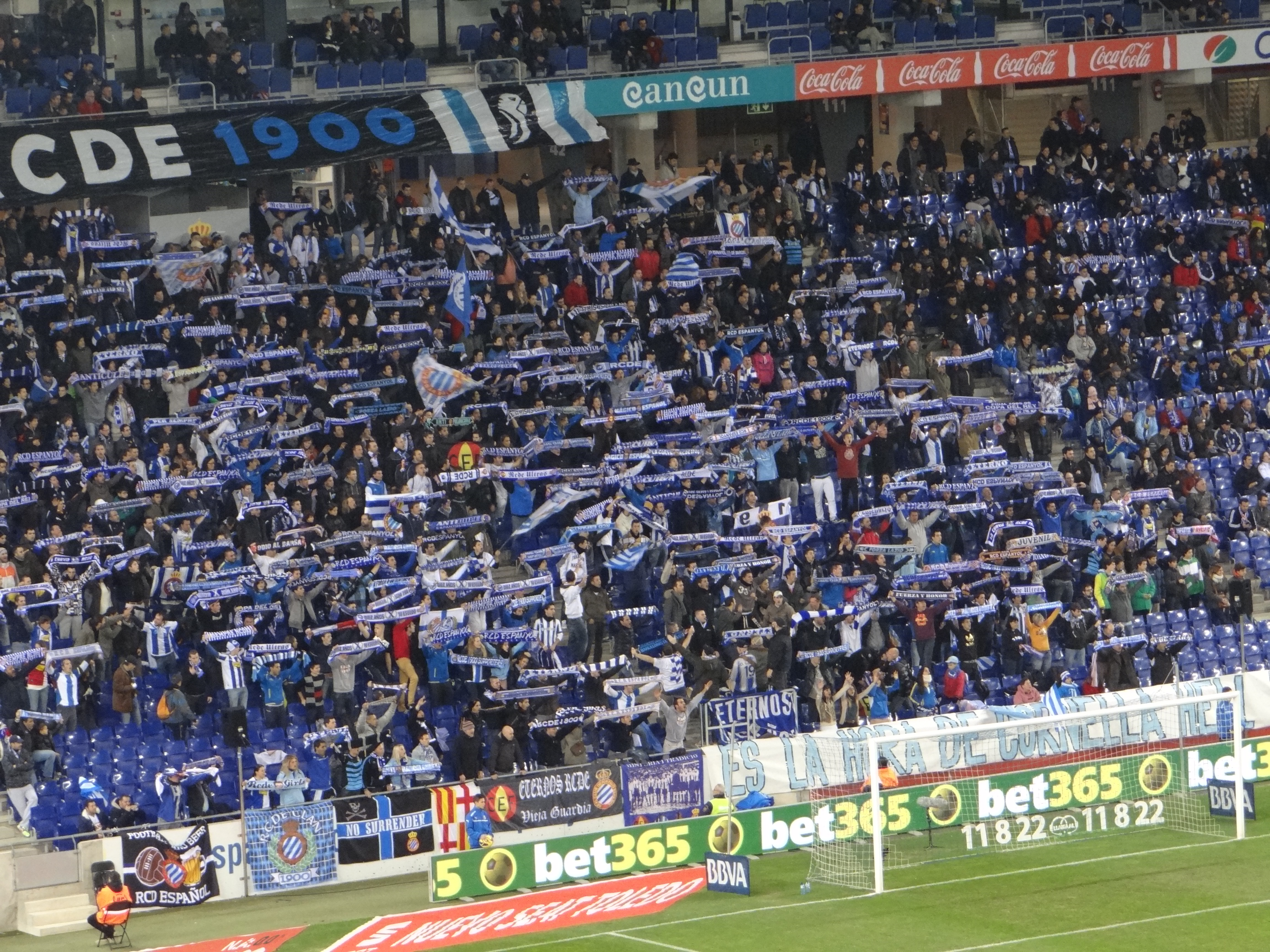

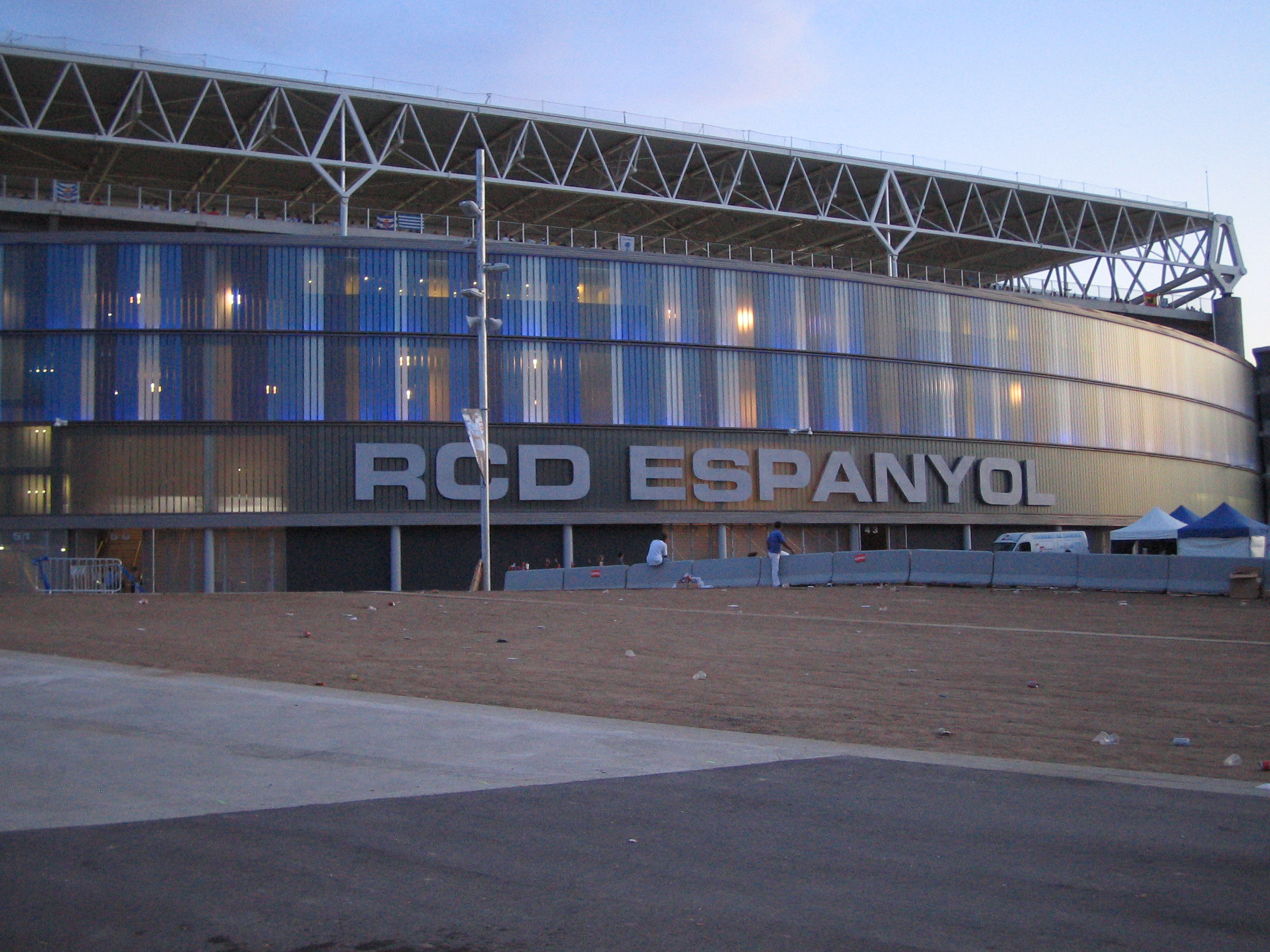

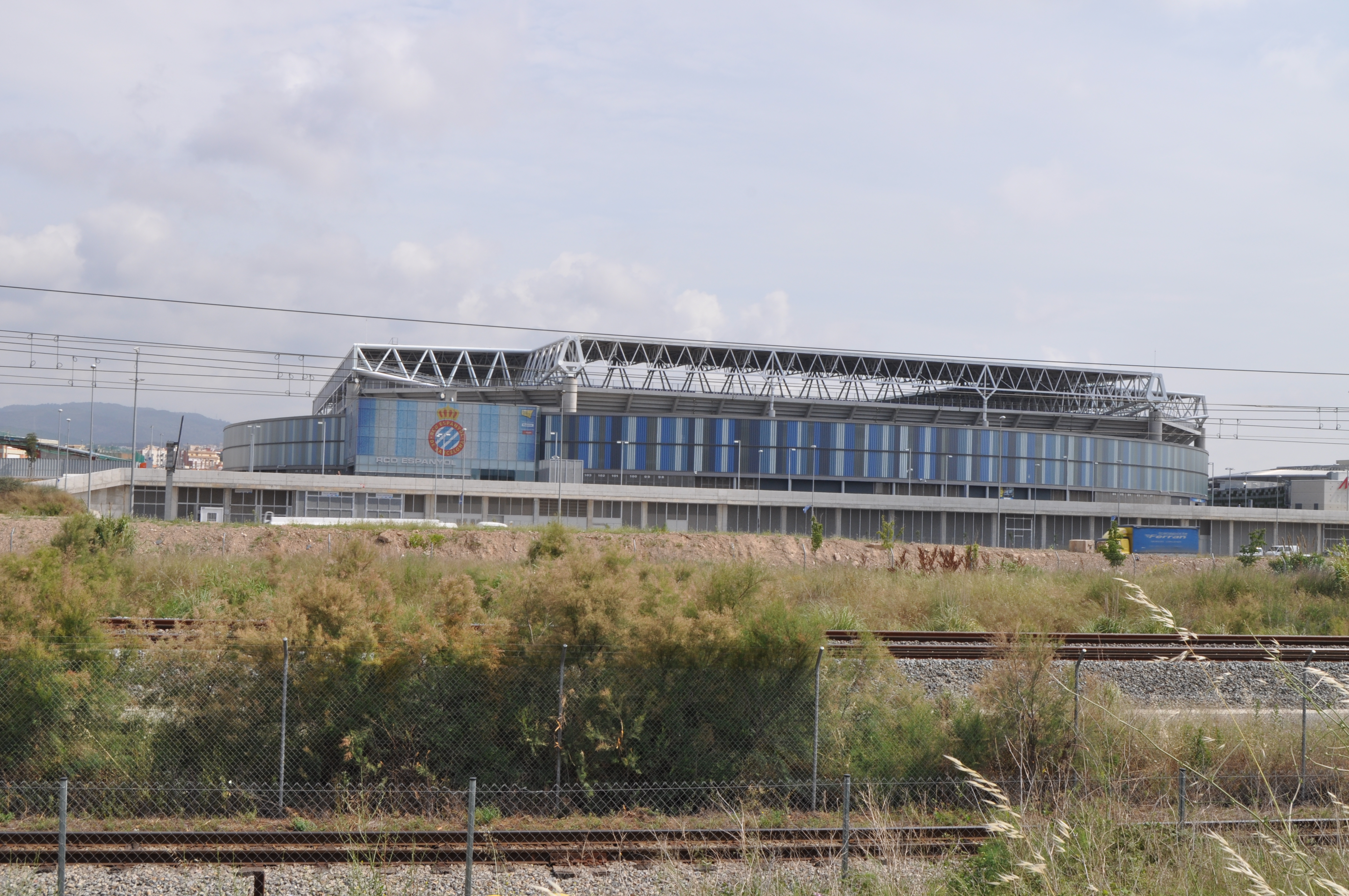

== League attendances ==
This is a list of league games attendances of Espanyol at Cornellà-El Prat.

| Season | Total | High | Low | Average |
|---|---|---|---|---|
| 2009–10 | 529,341 | 39,260 | 22,275 | 27,860 |
| 2010–11 | 497,691 | 40,240 | 20,134 | 26,193 |
| 2011–12 | 448,863 | 35,122 | 16,627 | 23,624 |
| 2012–13 | 397,596 | 30,023 | 15,280 | 20,926 |
| 2013–14 | 373,223 | 32,131 | 12,650 | 19,643 |
| 2014–15 | 355,128 | 30,253 | 12,710 | 18,691 |
| 2015–16 | 348,353 | 27,395 | 12,461 | 18,334 |
| 2016–17 | 381,428 | 31,082 | 14,813 | 20,075 |
| 2017–18 | 335,309 | 24,836 | 11,659 | 17,648 |
| 2018–19 | 362,219 | 25,700 | 13,469 | 19,064 |
| 2019–20 (Note: Matches played under closed doors not included.) | 296,935 | 32,084 | 17,390 | 22,841 |
| 2020–21 | Season played under closed doors | | | |
| 2021–22 (Note: Some matches played with limited attendance.) | 329,886 | 25,049 | 11,095 | 17,362 |
