= Fira de Barcelona =

Trade fair complex in Barcelona, Catalonia, Spain

Coordinates: 41°22′27″N 02°09′04″E

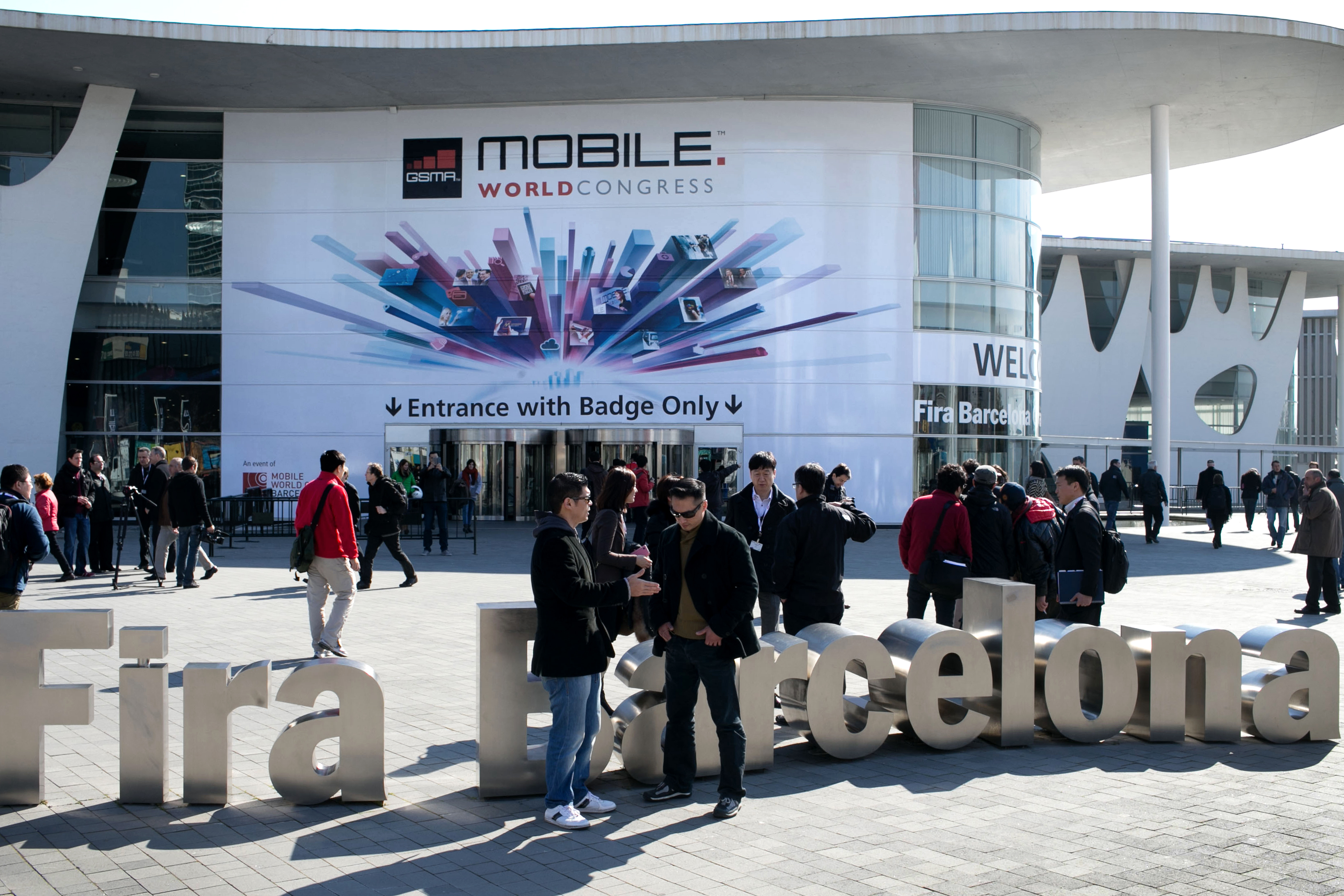
Fira Barcelona Gran Via during Mobile World Congress 2013

Fira de Barcelona is a trade fair complex and institution in L'Hospitalet de Llobregat and Barcelona, Catalonia, Spain. Every year, it organises numerous trade shows and congresses.

== Description ==
It hosts over 150 trade shows, congresses and corporate events per year with 30,000 exhibitors, both direct and represented, and receives 2.5 million visitors from over 200 countries. Its annual economic contribution to the city of Barcelona and its surroundings is estimated at over 6,100 million Euros.

Fira de Barcelona works to develop new opportunities for overseas business, especially in Asia and Latin America, geared to increasing the participation of Fira exhibitors in events in other countries, replicating some shows that are held in Barcelona and selling services, technology, management and advice to other organisers and exhibition centres.

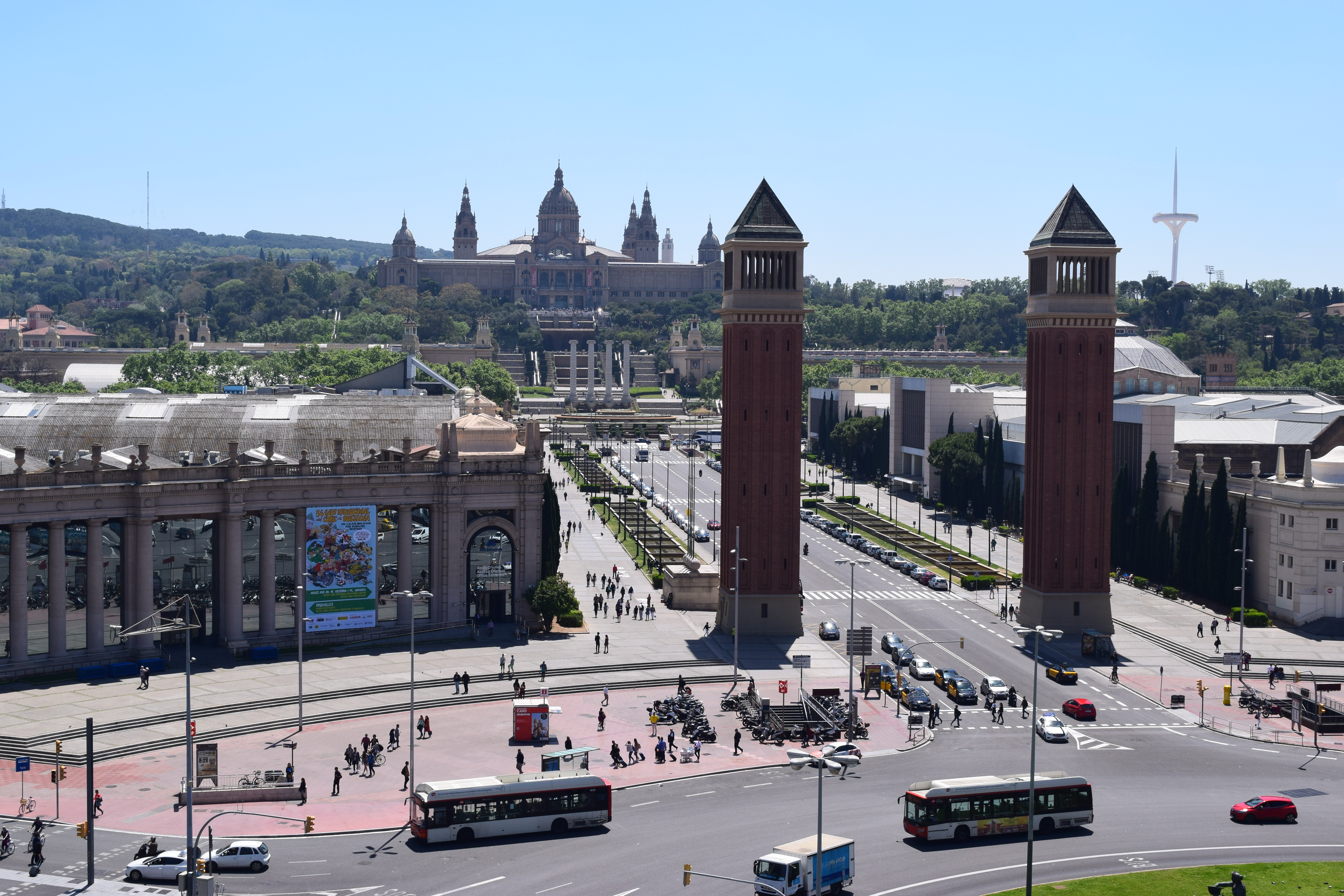
Montjuïc

== History ==
Barcelona's trade fair tradition dates back to the Exposición Universal of 1888 and the Exposición Internacional of 1929.

In 1932, Fira Internacional de Barcelona was officially constituted, declared for public use and, in 2000, the Generalitat de Catalunya was incorporated in the government organs, together with the Barcelona City Council and the Barcelona Chamber of Commerce.

== Venues ==
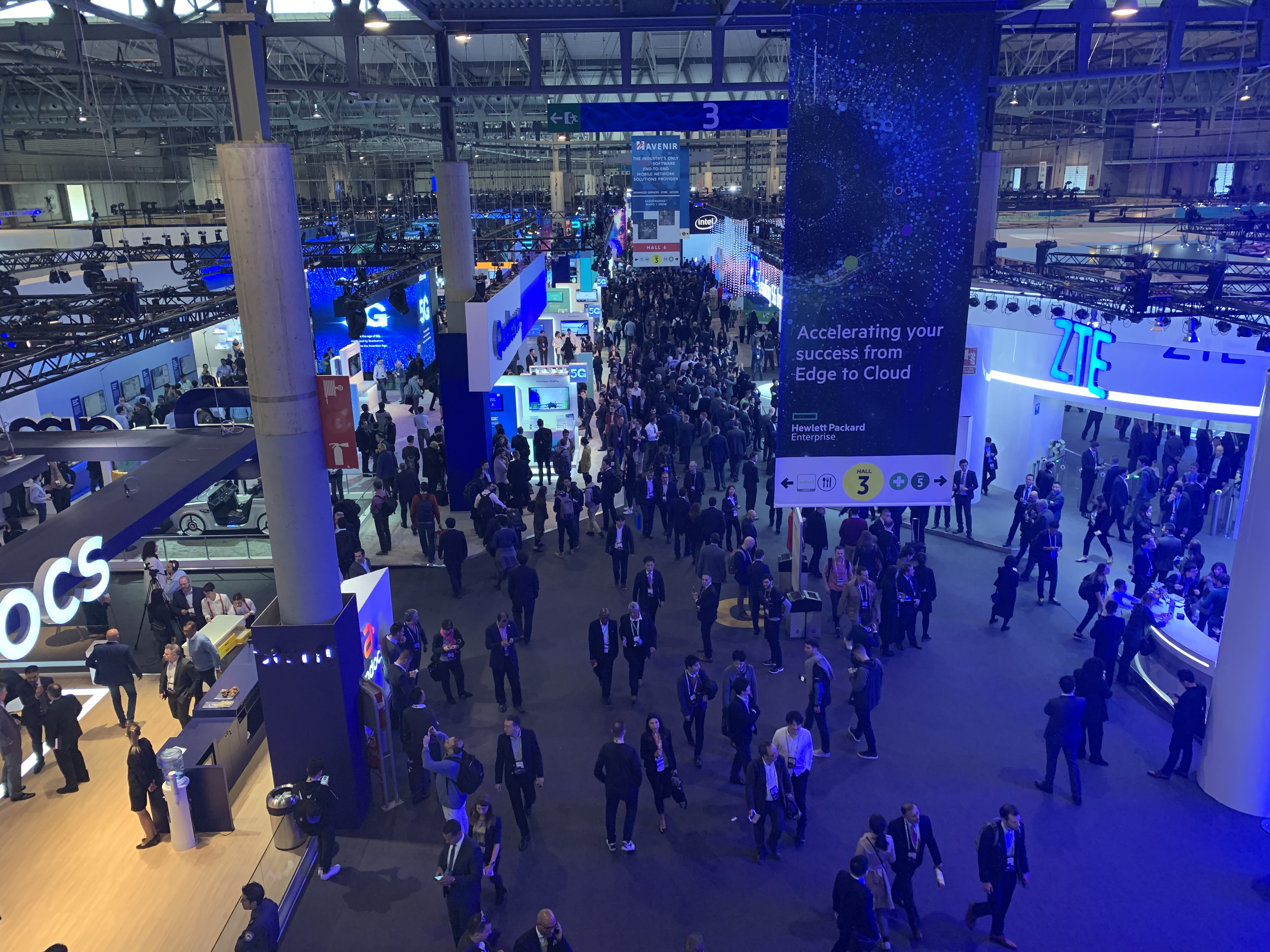
Stands during MWC Barcelona 2019

Fira de Barcelona has over 500,000 m^{2} of exhibition floor space and is one of the largest in Europe, divided into four large venues: the emblematic Montjuïc and the modern Gran Via, designed by the Japanese architect Toyo Ito. In November 2021, Fira de Barcelona took over the management of the Centro de Convenciones Internacional de Barcelona (CCIB) becoming the leading operator in Barcelona.

== Governance ==
In 2024, Pau Relat was president of the Fira de Barcelona. In September 2024, he was awarded the Premio Impulso Ciudades (Impulse Cities Award) in the Premios Vanguardia.

== Congresses ==
Fira de Barcelona hosts numerous congresses and business, social, cultural and institutional events in the facilities of the Montjuïc and Gran Via exhibition centres, where the Palau de Congresos de Barcelona and the Centro de Convenciones are located, respectively.

Notable events held in Fira de Barcelona are MWC Barcelona (MWC), Integrated Systems Europe (ISE), Salón del Manga de Barcelona, and Automobile Barcelona.

Among other events, Fira hosted the World Cardiology Congress in 2006 and the European Cardiology Congress in 1999 and 2009, organised by the European Society of Cardiology; the ESCMID Global 2024; the 14th World AIDS in 2002, organised by the International AIDS Society; The International Rotary Club Convention in 2002, organised by Rotary International; the United Nations meeting on Climate Change in 2009; and ITMA, the world's largest international textile machinery exhibition held in 2011 and 2019, organised by CEMATEX.

== Public transport ==
=== Fira Montjuïc ===
- Metro: Accessible via Espanya Station on Barcelona Metro Lines L1, L3, and L8.
- Bus: Served by Lines D20, H12, V7, 9, 13, 27, 37, 50, 65, 79, 91, 109, 150, and 165, with a direct bus to El Prat Airport.
- Train: Operated by FGC at Plaça d'Espanya, with service on Lines S8, S33, R6, R5, and S4.

=== Fira Gran Vía ===
- Metro:
  - Option 1: Accessible via Fira Station on L9.
  - Option 2: Accessible via Europa-Fira Station on L8 and L9.
- Bus: Served by Line 79, which connects Gran Via with Montjuïc and other city areas.
- Train: Operated by FGC on Lines S8, S33, R6, R5, and S4.
- Direct Connection: Provides a direct link between Plaça Espanya (Montjuïc Exhibition Centre) and Europa-Fira (Gran Via Exhibition Centre).
