= Sant Josep station =

Sant Josep
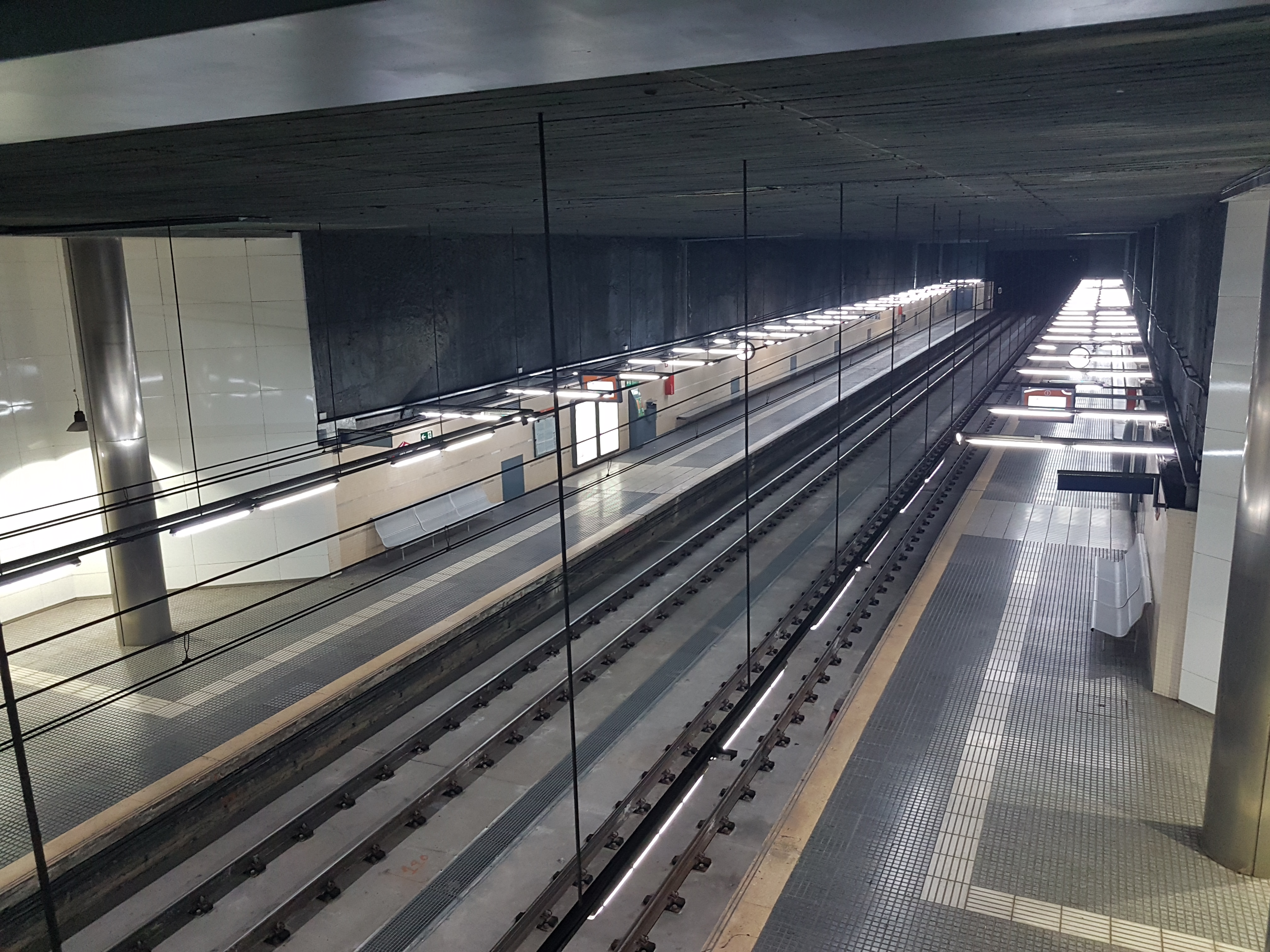
- View of the station's platforms

General information
- Location: L'Hospitalet de Llobregat (Sant Josep)
- Coordinates: 41°21′38″N 2°06′38″E
- System: FGC rapid transit station
- Owner: FGC
- Operator: FGC
- Platforms: 2 side platforms

Construction
- Structure type: Underground
- Accessible: Yes

Other information
- Fare zone: 1 (ATM)

History
- Opened: 8 July 1985

Services
Preceding station	FGC	Following station
L'Hospitalet Av. Carrilet towards Molí Nou-Ciutat Cooperativa	L8	Gornal towards Barcelona Pl. Espanya
L'Hospitalet Av. Carrilet towards Can Ros	S33	Gornal towards Barcelona Pl. Espanya
L'Hospitalet Av. Carrilet towards Olesa de Montserrat	S4	Gornal towards Barcelona Pl. Espanya
L'Hospitalet Av. Carrilet towards Martorell Enllaç	S8	Gornal towards Barcelona Pl. Espanya
L'Hospitalet Av. Carrilet towards Manresa Baixador	R5	Gornal towards Barcelona Pl. Espanya
L'Hospitalet Av. Carrilet towards Igualada	R6	Gornal towards Barcelona Pl. Espanya
L'Hospitalet Av. Carrilet towards Manresa Baixador	R50	Gornal towards Barcelona Pl. Espanya
L'Hospitalet Av. Carrilet towards Igualada	R60	Gornal towards Barcelona Pl. Espanya
Location

Sant Josep is a rapid transit station on the Llobregat-Anoia Line. Located between the Sant Josep neighborhood of L'Hospitalet de Llobregat, it is served by the FGC-operated Line 8 of the Barcelona Metro and several suburban rail services of the Llobregat-Anoia Line.

== Location ==
The station is located the Avinguda Carrilet of L'Hospitalet de Llobregat, in the neighborhood of Sant Josep. The platforms are physically located between the streets of Miquel Romeu and Mestre Candi. The station features a single entrance hall with fare gates on the Espanya side of the platforms. The access is located in Carrer de Santiago de Compostela, next to Carrilet.

== History ==
Sant Josep was originally an at-grade station on the Llobregat-Anoia Line, opened in 1957. The station was closed and rebuilt underground as the line's new tunnel was inaugurated between Cornellà and Sant Josep on July 8, 1985. In 2009 the station was renovated, with an expansion of the entrance hall and accommodation for PRM.
