= Llobregat–Anoia Line =

Railway line in Catalonia, Spain

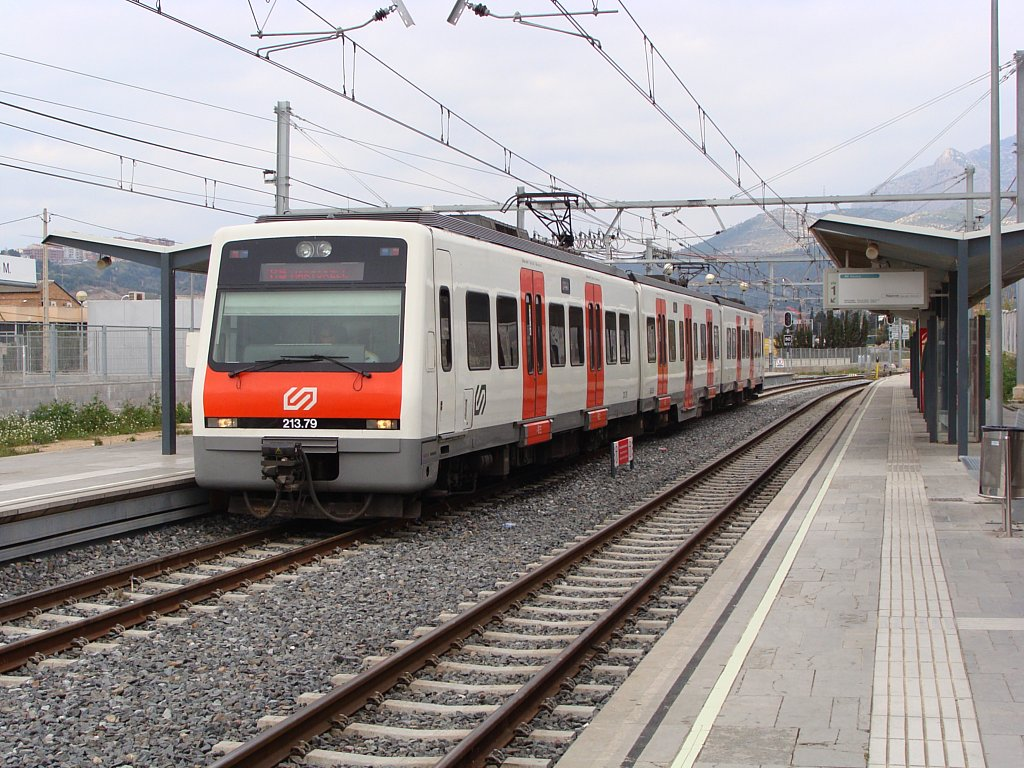
- A 213 Series train at Olesa de Montserrat station.

Overview
- Other name(s): El Carrilet, Els Catalans
- Native name: Línia Llobregat-Anoia
- Status: Operational
- Owner: Government of Catalonia
- Line number: L8, S3, S4, S8, S9, R5, R50, R6, R60
- Locale: Barcelona metropolitan area and northern Bages
- Termini: Pl. Espanya; Igualada, Manresa Baixador
- Stations: 41

Service
- Type: Rapid transit, commuter rail, freight rail
- Operator: Ferrocarrils de la Generalitat de Catalunya (FGC)
- Depot: Martorell Enllaç
- Rolling stock: 42 213 Series EMU sets; 5 257 Series dual power electro-diesel locomotives; 73 62000 Series covered hopper wagons; 86 63000 Series open wagons; 7 65000 Series autoracks (Note: Rolling stock data as of 2014.)
- Ridership: 23,100,222 passenger journeys (2018)

History
- Opened: 1885 (Manresa–Guardiola de Berguedà section, as the Manresa to Berga and Guardiola de Berguedà Economical Railway); 1893 (Martorell–Igualada section, as the Central Catalan Railway); 1912 (Barcelona–Martorell section)

Technical
- Line length: 138 km (86 mi)
- Number of tracks: 2 (main route, including the Martorell–Olesa de Montserrat section); 1 (Igualada and freight branches, including the Olesa de Montserrat–Manresa section)
- Character: At-grade, underground (in Barcelona, L'Hospitalet de Llobregat and Cornellà de Llobregat)
- Track gauge: 1,000 mm (3 ft 3 3/8 in) metre gauge
- Electrification: 1,500 V DC overhead lines (freight branches not electrified)

The Llobregat–Anoia Line (Catalan: Línia Llobregat-Anoia) is an unconnected metre gauge railway line linking Barcelona with the Baix Llobregat, Bages and Anoia regions, in Catalonia, Spain. Its name refers to the fact that it follows the course of the Llobregat and Anoia rivers for most of its length. Plaça d'Espanya station serves as the Barcelona terminus of the line, then continuing northwards to Martorell, where two main branches to Manresa and Igualada are formed. It also includes several freight branches, accounting for a total line length of 138 kilometres (86 mi) and 41 passenger stations.

Barcelona Metro Line 8, together with a number of commuter and freight rail services, runs on the line's main route between Barcelona and Sant Boi de Llobregat. The section between Barcelona and Olesa de Montserrat is operated as a high-frequency commuter rail system known as Baix Llobregat Metro (Catalan: Metro del Baix Llobregat), with some services continuing northwards to Manresa and Igualada. The Llobregat–Anoia Line is part of the Autoritat del Transport Metropolità (ATM) fare-integrated public transport system for the Barcelona metropolitan area.

== History ==
Share of the Tranvía o Ferrocarril Económico de Manresa a Berga, issued 17 September 1898.

The Llobregat–Anoia Line originated from three formerly separate narrow gauge railway lines: Tranvía o Ferrocarril Económico de Manresa a Berga (opened in 1885), Ferrocarril Central Catalán (opened in 1893) and Camino de Hierro del Nordeste de España, built to quickly and cheaply give passenger and freight transportation to the rapidly industrialising Llobregat area. The line was extended to Barcelona in 1912. Between 1985 and 1987, the section between Cornellà-Riera and Sant Josep was moved underground, followed by the section between Sant Josep and Espanya. The Metro del Baix Llobregat designation was first introduced on this line in 2000, and the Line 8 service has been formally included in the Barcelona Metro network since 6 November 2003.

=== Development plans ===
Geographically accurate map of Barcelona Metro line 8

An extension of the line further into central Barcelona, with a new station in Plaça Francesc Macià, has been discussed since May 1999. In January 2017, the Catalan government approved a plan to extend the Llobregat–Anoia line from Plaça d'Espanya through the city as far as Gràcia station, also stopping at Hospital Clínic and Francesc Macià station, thereby linking with the Barcelona–Vallès Line, at an estimated cost of over €300 million. The project was finally approved by the government of Catalonia in 2021, with the final alignment serving the stations Espanya, Hospital Clínic, Francesc Macià and Gràcia. It will connect to Trambaix routes T1, T2 and T3, Line 5 of the Barcelona Metro and the Vallès line. Preliminary works started in 2022, with major construction starting in January 2024. Tunneling is slated to begin in late 2025. The extension is expected to be operational by 2029 or 2030. A second phase is also being considered to extend the line towards the Besós river in the eastern part of the city, serving stations such as Joanic, Sagrada Familia and Glòries.

== List of stations ==
The following table lists the name of each station on the Llobregat–Anoia Line in order from south to north; a photo of the current station; the rail services operating at the station (L8, S3, S4, S8, R5, R50, R6 and/or R60); the date the current station was opened; the municipality or the city district (in the case of Barcelona) in which each station is located; the fare zone each station belongs to according to the Autoritat del Transport Metropolità (ATM) fare-integrated public transport system; remarkable notes about the station, including clarifications, additional information and a location map; and usage figures.

| # | Terminal of a service |
| * | Transfer station |
| #* | Transfer station and terminal |
| ¤ | Station located in Barcelona; city district indicated instead of municipality |
| ● | The train stops at the station |
| ｜ | The train skip the station |

| Station | Photo | Line(s) | | | | | | | | | Opened | Municipality | Fare zone | Notes | Usage (Note: All usage figures (entry only) are in millions per year for 2014.) |
Main route
| Pl. Espanya#* | | ● | ● | ● | ● | ● | ● | ● | ● | ● | 1 Jun 1926 | Sants-Montjuïc¤ | 1 | Connects with Barcelona Metro lines 1 and 3.^{map 1} | 5.39 |
| Magòria-La Campana | | ● | ● | ● | ● | ● | ● | ｜ | ● | ｜ | 11 Jul 1997 | Sants-Montjuïc¤ | 1 | Original at-grade station opened 1912.^{map 2} | 0.53 |
| Ildefons Cerdà* | | ● | ● | ● | ● | ● | ● | ● | ● | ● | 2 Mar 1987 | L'Hospitalet de Llobregat | 1 | Connects with Barcelona Metro line 10 (200-metre walk at street level).^{map 3} | 1.20 |
| Europa – Fira* | | ● | ● | ● | ● | ● | ● | ● | ● | ● | 13 May 2007 | L'Hospitalet de Llobregat | 1 | Connects with Barcelona Metro line 9 (L9 Sud).^{map 4} | 1.44 |
| Gornal* | | ● | ● | ● | ● | ● | ● | ● | ● | ● | 2 Mar 1987 | L'Hospitalet de Llobregat | 1 | Connects with Rodalies de Catalunya commuter and regional rail services at Bellvitge station.^{map 5} | 0.69 |
| Sant Josep | | ● | ● | ● | ● | ● | ● | ● | ● | ● | 8 Jul 1985 | L'Hospitalet de Llobregat | 1 | ^{map 6} | 0.79 |
| L'Hospitalet Av. Carrilet* | | ● | ● | ● | ● | ● | ● | ● | ● | ● | 9 Jul 1985 | L'Hospitalet de Llobregat | 1 | Original at-grade station opened 1912. Connects with Barcelona Metro line 1.^{map 7} | 1.99 |
| Almeda | | ● | ● | ● | ● | ● | ● | ● | ● | ● | 9 Jul 1985 | Cornellà de Llobregat | 1 | ^{map 8} | 1.09 |
| Cornellà Riera | | ● | ● | ● | ● | ● | ● | ● | ● | ● | 9 Jul 1985 | Cornellà de Llobregat | 1 | ^{map 9} | 1.19 |
| Sant Boi | | ● | ● | ● | ● | ● | ● | ● | ● | ● | 29 Dec 1912 | Sant Boi de Llobregat | 1 | ^{map 10} | 1.83 |
| Molí Nou-Ciutat Cooperativa# | | ● | ● | ● | ● | ● | ● | ｜ | ● | ｜ | 13 Feb 2000 | Sant Boi de Llobregat | 1 | ^{map 11} | 0.68 |
| Colònia Güell | | No service | ● | ● | ● | ● | ｜ | ｜ | ｜ | ｜ | 13 Feb 2000 | Santa Coloma de Cervelló | 2B | ^{map 12} | 0.04 |
| Santa Coloma de Cervelló | | No service | ● | ● | ● | ● | ｜ | ｜ | ● | ● | 13 Feb 2000 | Santa Coloma de Cervelló | 2B | ^{map 13} | 0.12 |
| Sant Vicenç dels Horts | | No service | ● | ● | ● | ● | ● | ● | ● | ● | 29 Dec 1912 | Sant Vicenç dels Horts | 2B | ^{map 14} | 0.47 |
| Can Ros# | | No service | ● | ● | ● | ● | ● | ｜ | ● | ｜ | 1972 | Sant Vicenç dels Horts | 2B | ^{map 15} | 0.37 |
| Quatre Camins | | No service | No service | ● | ● | ● | ● | ｜ | ● | ｜ | 4 Jul 2003 | Sant Vicenç dels Horts | 2B | ^{map 16} | 0.14 |
| Pallejà | | No service | No service | ● | ● | No service | ● | ● | ● | ｜ | 20 Oct 2007 | Pallejà | 2B | Original at-grade station opened 1912.^{map 17} | 0.23 |
| Sant Andreu de la Barca | | No service | No service | ● | ● | No service | ● | ● | ● | ● | 20 Nov 2001 | Sant Andreu de la Barca | 2B | Original at-grade station opened 1912.^{map 18} | 0.51 |
| El Palau | | No service | No service | ● | ● | No service | ● | ｜ | ● | ｜ | 25 Apr 2002 | Sant Andreu de la Barca | 2B | ^{map 19} | 0.20 |
| Martorell Vila – Castellbisbal | | No service | No service | ● | ● | No service | ｜ | ｜ | ｜ | ｜ | 29 Dec 1912 | Castellbisbal | 2B | ^{map 20} | 0.03 |
| Martorell Central* | | No service | No service | ● | ● | No service | ● | ● | ● | ● | 21 May 2007 | Martorell | 3B | Original station opened 1893 as the southern terminus of the Catalan Central Railway. Connects with Rodalies de Catalunya commuter rail services.^{map 21} | 0.38 |
| Martorell Enllaç# | | No service | No service | ● | ● | No service | ● | ｜ | ● | ｜ | 29 Dec 1912 | Martorell | 3B | ^{map 22} | 0.15 |
Manresa branch
| Abrera | | No service | No service | ● | No service | No service | ● | ● | No service | No service | 29 Mar 1922 | Abrera | 3B | ^{map 23} | 0.12 |
| Olesa de Montserrat#* | | No service | No service | ● | No service | No service | ● | ● | No service | No service | 29 Mar 1922 | Olesa de Montserrat | 3B | Connects with the Olesa de Montserrat–Esparreguera Cable Car, which has been temporarily closed since August 2012.^{map 24} | 0.26 |
| Aeri de Montserrat* | | No service | No service | No service | No service | No service | ● | ｜ | No service | No service | 17 May 1930 | Monistrol de Montserrat | 4Z | Connects with the Montserrat Cable Car.^{map 25} | 0.11 |
| Monistrol de Montserrat* | | No service | No service | No service | No service | No service | ● | ● | No service | No service | 29 Oct 1922 | Monistrol de Montserrat | 4Z | Connects with the Montserrat Rack Railway.^{map 26} | 0.22 |
| Castellbell i el Vilar | | No service | No service | No service | No service | No service | ● | ｜ | No service | No service | 22 Aug 1924 | Castellbell i el Vilar | 5D | ^{map 27} | 0.004 |
| Sant Vicenç – Castellgalí | | No service | No service | No service | No service | No service | ● | ● | No service | No service | 22 Aug 1924 | Sant Vicenç de Castellet | 5D | ^{map 28} | 0.11 |
| Manresa Viladordis | | No service | No service | No service | No service | No service | ● | ● | No service | No service | 16 Jul 1985 | Manresa | l | ^{map 29} | 0.05 |
| Manresa Alta | | No service | No service | No service | No service | No service | ● | ● | No service | No service | 22 Aug 1924 | Manresa | l | Original station opened 1885 together with the Manresa–Puig-reig section of the Manresa to Berga and Guardiola de Berguedà Economical Railway.^{map 30} | 0.07 |
| Manresa Baixador# | | No service | No service | No service | No service | No service | ● | ● | No service | No service | 9 Jun 1971 | Manresa | l | ^{map 31} | 0.13 |
Igualada branch
| Sant Esteve Sesrovires | | No service | No service | No service | No service | No service | No service | No service | ● | ● | 29 Jul 1893 | Sant Esteve Sesrovires | 3B | ^{map 32} | 0.10 |
| La Beguda | | No service | No service | No service | No service | No service | No service | No service | ● | ｜ | 29 Jul 1893 | Masquefa | 4C | ^{map 33} | 0.01 |
| Can Parellada | | No service | No service | No service | No service | No service | No service | No service | ● | ｜ | 1971 | Masquefa | 4C | ^{map 34} | 0.01 |
| Masquefa | | No service | No service | No service | No service | No service | No service | No service | ● | ● | 29 Jul 1893 | Masquefa | 4C | ^{map 35} | 0.10 |
| Piera | | No service | No service | No service | No service | No service | No service | No service | ● | ● | 29 Jul 1893 | Piera | 4C | ^{map 36} | 0.16 |
| Vallbona d'Anoia | | No service | No service | No service | No service | No service | No service | No service | ● | ● | 29 Jul 1893 | Vallbona d'Anoia | 5C | ^{map 37} | 0.03 |
| Capellades | | No service | No service | No service | No service | No service | No service | No service | ● | ● | 29 Jul 1893 | Vallbona d'Anoia | 5C | ^{map 38} | 0.05 |
| La Pobla de Claramunt | | No service | No service | No service | No service | No service | No service | No service | ● | ● | 29 Jul 1893 | La Pobla de Claramunt | 5C | ^{map 39} | 0.03 |
| Vilanova del Camí | | No service | No service | No service | No service | No service | No service | No service | ● | ● | 29 Jul 1893 | Vilanova del Camí | 6B | ^{map 40} | 0.03 |
| Igualada# | | No service | No service | No service | No service | No service | No service | No service | ● | ● | 1978 | Igualada | 6B | ^{map 41} | 0.19 |

== See also ==
- Ferrocarrils de la Generalitat de Catalunya
- Barcelona Metro
- Olesa de Montserrat–Esparreguera Cable Car
- Montserrat Rack Railway
- Montserrat Cable Car
- Barcelona–Vallès Line

== Maps ==
- ^map 1Pl. Espanya – 41.374701°N 2.148494°E
- ^map 2Magòria-La Campana– 41.3675°N 2.139444°E
- ^map 3Ildefons Cerdà – 41.3608°N 2.13028°E
- ^map 4Europa | Fira – 41.356978°N 2.124908°E
- ^map 5Gornal – 41.354889°N 2.117417°E
- ^map 6Sant Josep – 41.360556°N 2.110556°E
- ^map 7L'Hospitalet Av. Carrilet – 41.357944°N 2.102722°E
- ^map 8Almeda – 41.353056°N 2.085278°E
- ^map 9Cornellà Riera – 41.351389°N 2.070833°E
- ^map 10Sant Boi – 41.348056°N 2.043333°E
- ^map 11Molí Nou-Ciutat Cooperativa – 41.357778°N 2.034444°E
- ^map 12Colònia Güell – 41.364433°N 2.031303°E
- ^map 13Santa Coloma de Cervelló – 41.370114°N 2.023803°E
- ^map 14Sant Vicenç dels Horts – 41.388139°N 2.012464°E
- ^map 15Can Ros – 41.399325°N 2.004964°E
- ^map 16Quatre Camins– 41.406956°N 2.001636°E
- ^map 17Pallejà – 41.420917°N 1.995528°E
- ^map 18Sant Andreu de la Barca – 41.446742°N 1.973289°E
- ^map 19El Palau – 41.455817°N 1.962231°E
- ^map 20Martorell Vila | Castellbisbal – 41.475881°N 1.939033°E
- ^map 21Martorell Central – 41.478944°N 1.925422°E
- ^map 22Martorell Enllaç – 41.483833°N 1.918972°E
- ^map 23Abrera – 41.522567°N 1.9067°E
- ^map 24Olesa de Montserrat – 41.541142°N 1.888661°E
- ^map 25Aeri de Montserrat – 41.590875°N 1.853181°E
- ^map 26Monistrol de Montserrat – 41.610339°N 1.849122°E
- ^map 27Castellbell i el Vilar – 41.640503°N 1.854814°E
- ^map 28Sant Vicenç | Castellgalí – 41.667917°N 1.859753°E
- ^map 29Manresa Viladordis – 41.7247°N 1.833986°E
- ^map 30Manresa Alta – 41.732081°N 1.832972°E
- ^map 31Manresa Baixador – 41.731414°N 1.827897°E
- ^map 32Sant Esteve Sesrovires – 41.497597°N 1.872492°E
- ^map 33La Beguda – 41.501744°N 1.838789°E
- ^map 34Can Parellada – 41.502203°N 1.830808°E
- ^map 35Masquefa – 41.502833°N 1.812558°E
- ^map 36Piera – 41.525908°N 1.754383°E
- ^map 37Vallbona d'Anoia – 41.520178°N 1.709006°E
- ^map 38Capellades – 41.521506°N 1.695117°E
- ^map 39La Pobla de Claramunt – 41.554567°N 1.677847°E
- ^map 40Vilanova del Camí – 41.573194°N 1.642106°E
- ^map 41Igualada – 41.578001°N 1.629981°E

== Bibliography ==
- Memòria de Ferrocarrils de la Generalitat de Catalunya 2014 [2014 Report of Ferrocarrils de la Generalitat de Catalunya] (PDF) (Report) (in Catalan). Ferrocarrils de la Generalitat de Catalunya. 2015.
