= Molí Nou-Ciutat Cooperativa station =

Coordinates: 41°21′28″N 2°2′4″E

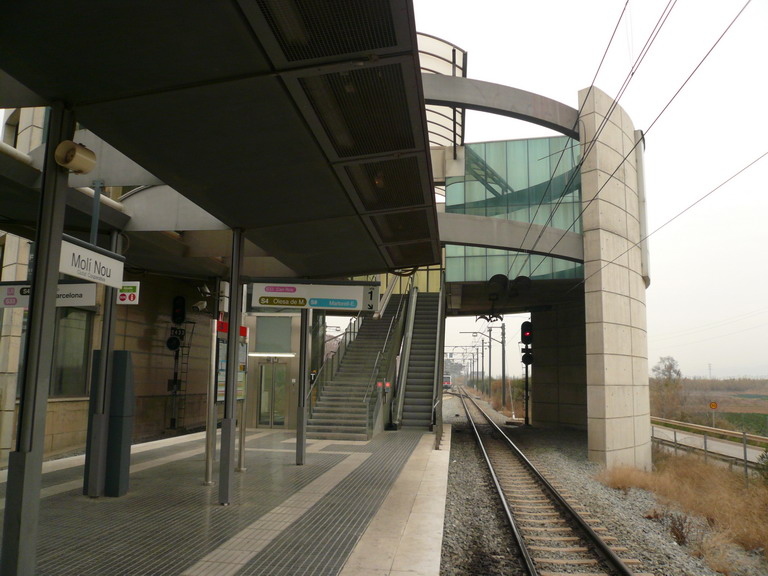
View of the station's island platform in 2007.

Molí Nou-Ciutat Cooperativa is a railway station on the Llobregat–Anoia Line. It is located in the neighborhood of Molí Nou of the Sant Boi de Llobregat municipality, to the south-west of Barcelona, in Catalonia, Spain. It was opened on 13 February 2000. It is served by Barcelona Metro line 8, Baix Llobregat Metro lines S3, S4, S8 and S9 and commuter rail lines R5 and R6.

| Preceding station | FGC | Following station |
|---|---|---|
| Terminus | L8 | Sant Boi towards Barcelona Pl. Espanya |
| Colònia Güell towards Can Ros | S33 | Sant Boi towards Barcelona Pl. Espanya |
| Colònia Güell towards Olesa de Montserrat | S4 | Sant Boi towards Barcelona Pl. Espanya |
| Colònia Güell towards Martorell Enllaç | S8 | Sant Boi towards Barcelona Pl. Espanya |
| Colònia Güell towards Manresa Baixador | R5 | Sant Boi towards Barcelona Pl. Espanya |
| Colònia Güell towards Igualada | R6 | Sant Boi towards Barcelona Pl. Espanya |
