= Igualada (Llobregat–Anoia Line) =

Railway station in Catalonia, Spain

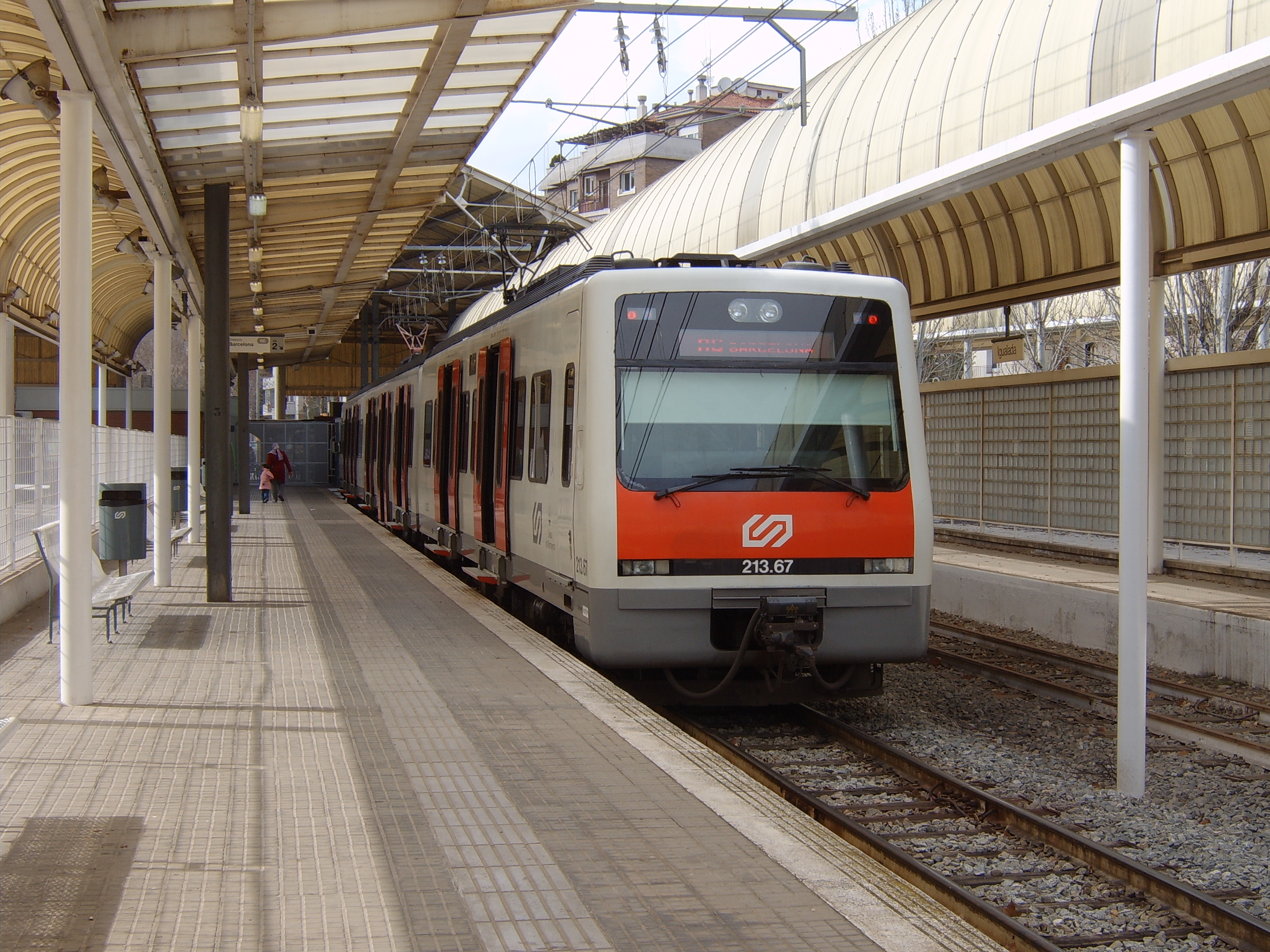
- A 213 Series train at the station.

General information
- Location: Passeig Mossèn Jacint Verdaguer; 08700 Igualada; Catalonia; Spain
- Coordinates: 41°34′40.5″N 1°37′48.6″E
- System: FGC commuter rail station
- Owner: Government of Catalonia
- Operator: Ferrocarrils de la Generalitat de Catalunya (FGC)
- Line: Llobregat–Anoia Line
- Platforms: 2 side platforms
- Tracks: 2
- Connections: Adjacent bus station; Urban buses

Construction
- Structure type: At-grade
- Parking: A parking lot is located adjacent to the station, on the south side of it.
- Accessible: Yes

Other information
- Fare zone: 6B (ATM Àrea de Barcelona)

History
- Opened: 1978

Passengers
- 2013: 190,004 (Note: Passenger figures according to recorded annual entries.)

Services
Preceding station	FGC	Following station
Terminus	R6	Vilanova del Camí towards Barcelona Pl. Espanya
Terminus	R60	Vilanova del Camí towards Barcelona Pl. Espanya
Location

Igualada is a railway station on the Llobregat–Anoia Line serving the city of the same name, in Catalonia, Spain. It is located adjacent to the bus station, in the southeastern part of town. The railway station is the northern terminus of the Igualada line branch and is served by commuter rail lines R6 and R60.

Although the current station opened in 1978, a narrow gauge railway line from Martorell, predecessor of the current line, had already been serving the city since 1893. In 2015, it was announced that the current at-grade station is to be put underground together with a 300-metre-long (980 ft) line portion, removing the only level crossing in town.

== History ==
Originally, it was envisaged that Igualada would be part of the Madrid to Barcelona railway through central Catalonia. This plan, however, was dropped in favour of Manresa, located further north. On 9 July 1893, the railway eventually arrived in Igualada in the form of a narrow gauge line from Martorell, built and operated by Ferrocarril Central Catalán ("Catalan Central Railway"), which would later become the current Llobregat–Anoia Line. The original terminus station was located at-grade in the northwestern part of the city. In 1978, the original station was replaced with a new one in the southeastern part of town, resulting in the dismantling of about 1.5 kilometres (0.93 mi) of railway lines through the city center, including the removal of several busy level crossings and the demolition of the original station building. The recovered land allowed for the extension of the Passeig Mossèn Jacint Verdaguer boulevard.
