= Narrow-gauge railways in Kazakhstan =

Since 1954, Kazakhstan has developed many 750 mm (2 ft 5 1/2 in) gauge lines, in six individual networks with a total length of approximately 1150 km.

== Overview ==
- Atbasar network, 255 km
- Kokchetav network, 305 km, operational since 1954, partly regauged to Russian gauge (1,520 mm (4 ft 11 27/32 in)).
- Kustanay, 143 km, opened in 1953.
- Utjak to Peski-Celinnie line, 264 km
- Novo-Uritskoje – Kovilnaja, 94 km, opened in 1957.
- Bulaevo line, approximately 99 km long, opened in 1957, closed in 1989.
- Kotrbulak Acisaj line via Ujik, Kokkija and Sergo, 47 km industrial railway operated by the metallurgical combine Acpolimetall in Kentau, closed in 1980.

== Children's railways ==
Kazakhstan has several children's (pioneers) railways located in or near cities.

- Alma-Ata Children's Railway, 1.2 km long circular railway opened in 1952.
- Arkaluk Children's Railway, almost nothing is known about this railway. Opened approximately 1986 and closed in 1993.
- Astana Children's Railway, opened in 1946 and closed in 2002.
- Atbasar Children's Railway, opened in November 1979 and has been closed and dismantled between 1991 and 1996.
- Shymkent Children's Railway, 6 km long, opened in 1980.
- Karaganda Children's Railway, 5.1 km long, opened on 1 May 1957.
- Kokchetav Children's Railway, opened in 1984 and closed in 1995.
- Kustanaj Children's Railway, 3 km and opened on 7 October 1978, closed in 1999.
- Kurort-Borovoe Children's Railway, opened in 1979 and closed in 1998/1999.
- Pavlodar Children's Railway, opened in 1979 and closed in 2008.
- Semipalatinsk Children's Railway, 1–2 km long circular railway, opened in 1981 and closed in 1989.
