= 750 mm gauge railways =

Railway track gauge

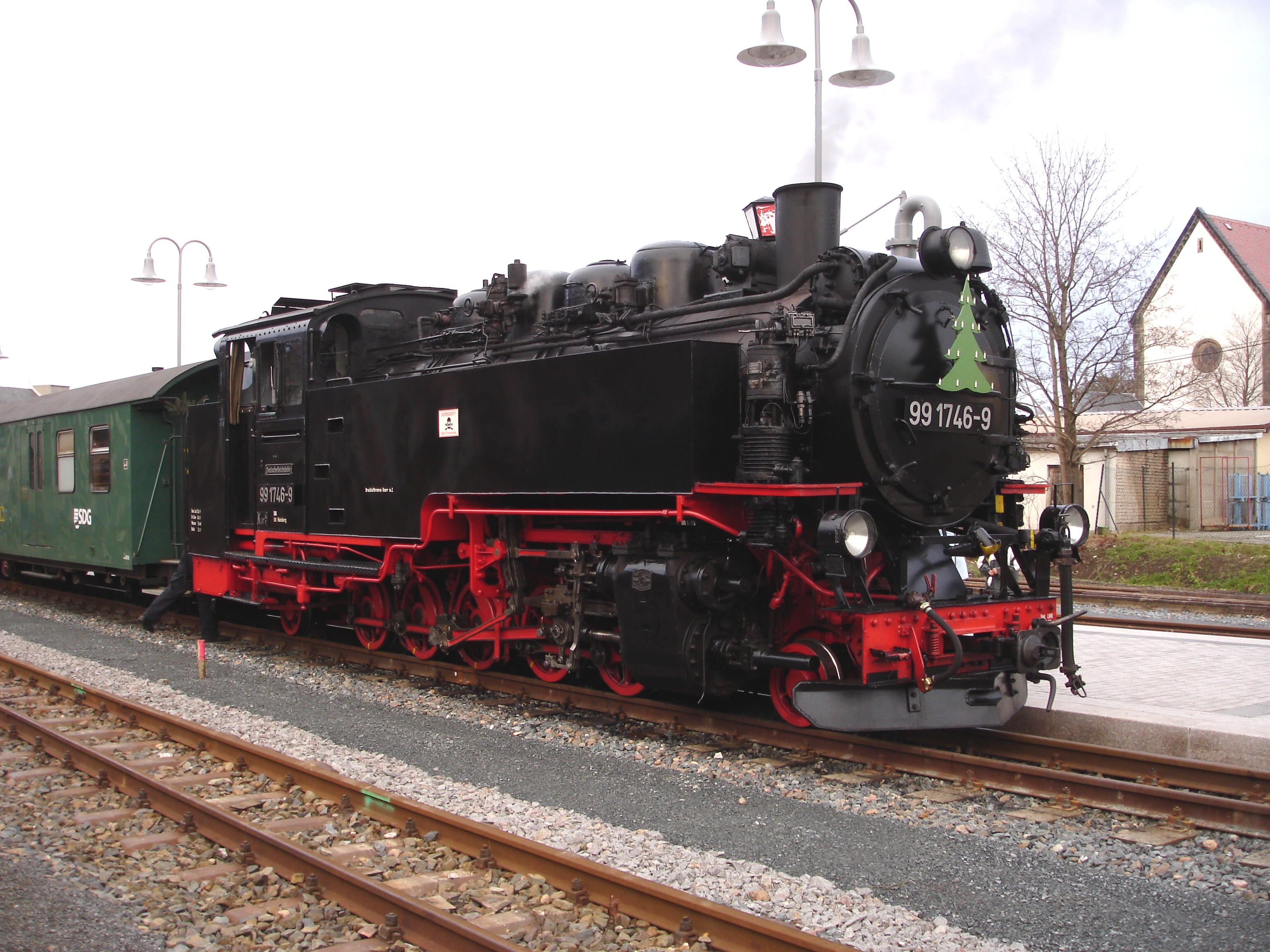
Locomotive 99 1746 of the Weisseritz Valley Railway in Germany

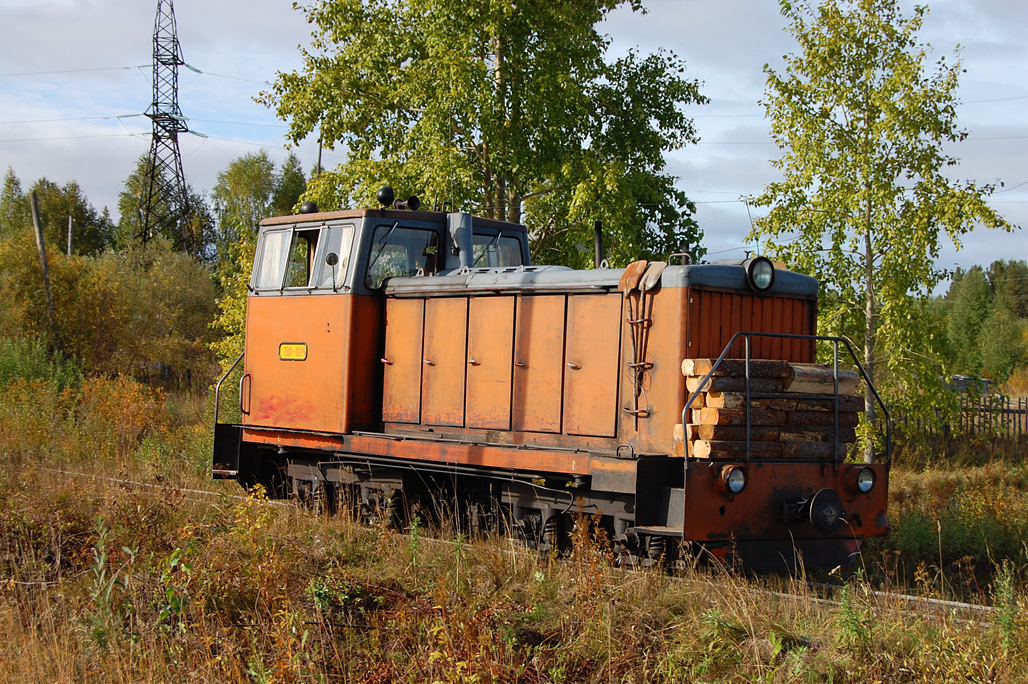
TU8 diesel locomotive in Arkhangelsk Oblast, Russia

750 mm (2 ft 5 1/2 in) narrow-gauge railways are very similar to 760 mm (2 ft 5 15/16 in) and 2 ft 6 in (762 mm) gauge. 750 mm gauge rolling stock is almost compatible with 760 and 762 mm railways.

== Railways ==
Country/territory	Railway
Algeria	Societe Anonyme des Mines du Zaccar
Argentina	Central Chubut Railway; Ferrocarril General Manuel Belgrano; stretch of 48 mi (77.2 km) now probably 1,000 mm (3 ft 3 3/8 in), like the rest of the network; La Trochita; 174 mi (280.0 km); Ramal Ferro Industrial Río Turbio
Austria	International Rhine Regulation Railway
Armenia	Yerevan Children's railway
Azerbaijan	Baku Children's railway
Belarus	Children's Railroad (Minsk); Rudensk peat railway, field railway from Dukštas, (Lithuania) to Druja
Bolivia	FC Vinto - Cochabamba - Arani; 42 mi (68 km) 1914-1948
Chile	Ferrocarril Yungay–Barrancas
Czech Republic	Frýdlant–Heřmanice Railway
Denmark	Main article: List of town tramway systems in Denmark
Egypt	Egyptian Delta Light Railways, Fayoum Light Railway
Ecuador	FC El Oro, Southern line; FC de Bahia a Chone
Estonia	Main article: Narrow-gauge railways in Estonia
Finland	Formerly numerous privately owned railways, Jokioinen Railway
France	CF Economiques Forestiers des Landes
Georgia	A children's railway in Mushthaid Park in Tbilisi
Germany	Döllnitzbahn GmbH; Lößnitzgrundbahn; Narrow-gauge railways in Saxony; Weißeritztalbahn; Zittauer Schmalspurbahn
Greece	Diakofto–Kalavryta Railway between Diakopto and Kalavryta in Peloponnese
Greenland	Disko Island near Qutdligssat; Ivigtut; Julianehaab; Malmbjerg; Maamorilik; Mestersvig, From 1956 to 1963, Mestersvig was a zinc and lead mine.; Nordic Mining Company, Mestersvig
Indonesia	Used by some sugar mills in Java, such as Banjaratma, Madukismo, Ceper Baru, Colomadu, Tasikmadu, Pakis Baru, and Trangkil. Only Madukismo are still operating.; Used in the construction of Atjeh Tram.
Kazakhstan	Main article: Narrow-gauge railways in Kazakhstan
Latvia	Main article: Narrow-gauge railways in Latvia
Lithuania	Main article: Narrow-gauge railways in Lithuania
Morocco	Industrial and mine railways in former Spanish Morocco (all defunct)
Netherlands	Various tram systems (all defunct)
Norway	Nesttun–Os Line; 1894–1935; Sulitjelma Line; 1892–1915, converted to 1,067 mm (3 ft 6 in), dismantled 1972; Urskog–Høland Line; 1896-1960, heritage 3km from 1966
Poland	Main article: Narrow-gauge railways in Poland
Puerto Rico	Tranvía de la Capital a Río Piedras 1880-1900 (defunct)
Russia	Main article: Narrow-gauge railways in Russia
Spain	FC de Flassa a Palamos, Gerona y Banolas; FC de Onda al Grao de Castellon y Villareal-Puerto de Burriana; FC de San Feliu de Guixois a Gerona; FC Granada a Sierra Nevada; FC Valdepenas a Puertollano
Switzerland	International Rhine Regulation Railway; Marzilibahn funicular; Waldenburgerbahn, 1880–2021; converted to metre-gauge 2021–22
Turkey	Ilıca–Palamutluk railway; Samsun–Çarşamba Railway Line
Ukraine	Main article: Narrow-gauge railways in Ukraine
Uzbekistan	A railway in National Park of Uzbekistan in Tashkent

== Gallery ==
Examples and details of 750 mm gauge railways

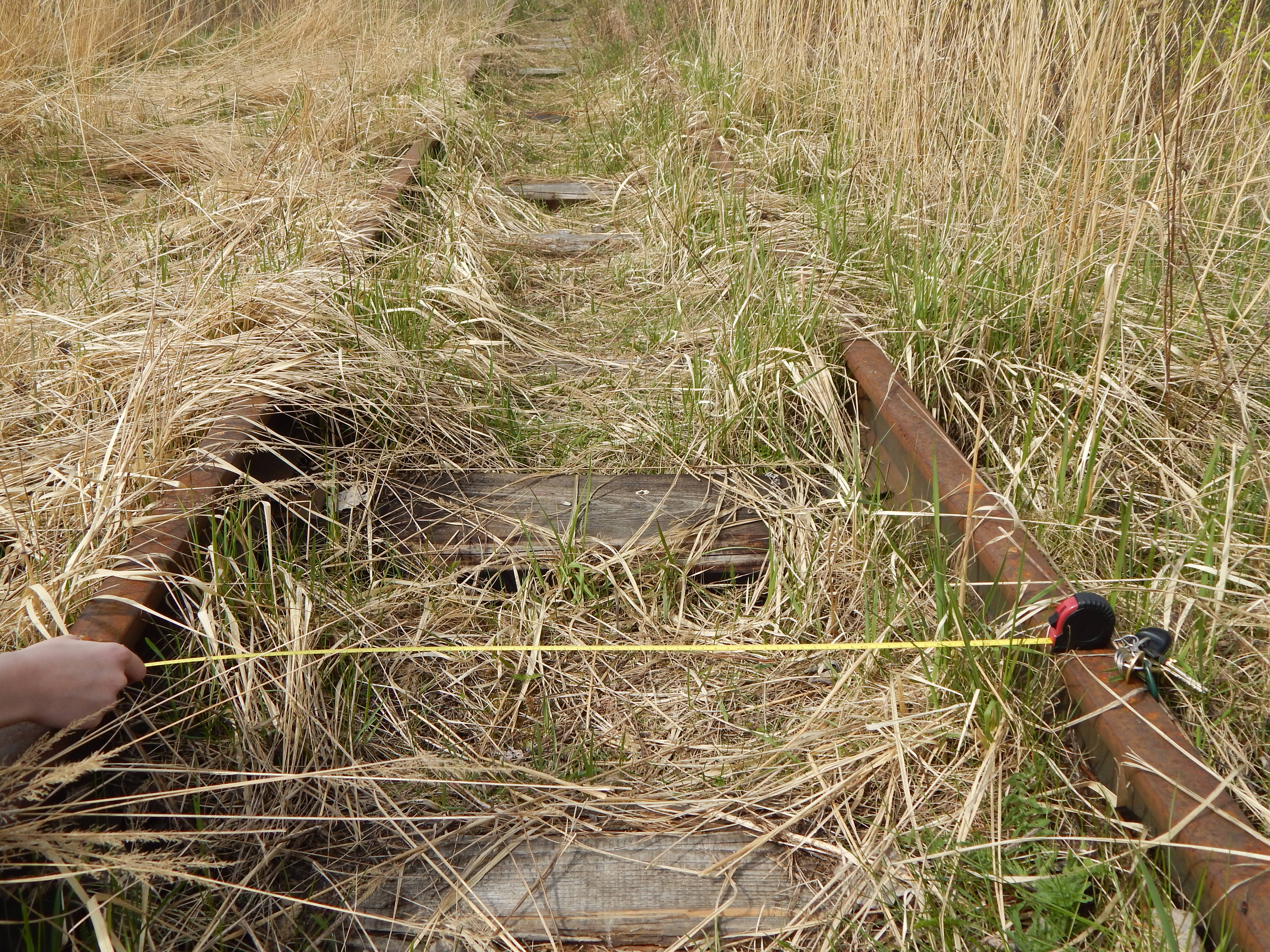
Measuring by the tape measure

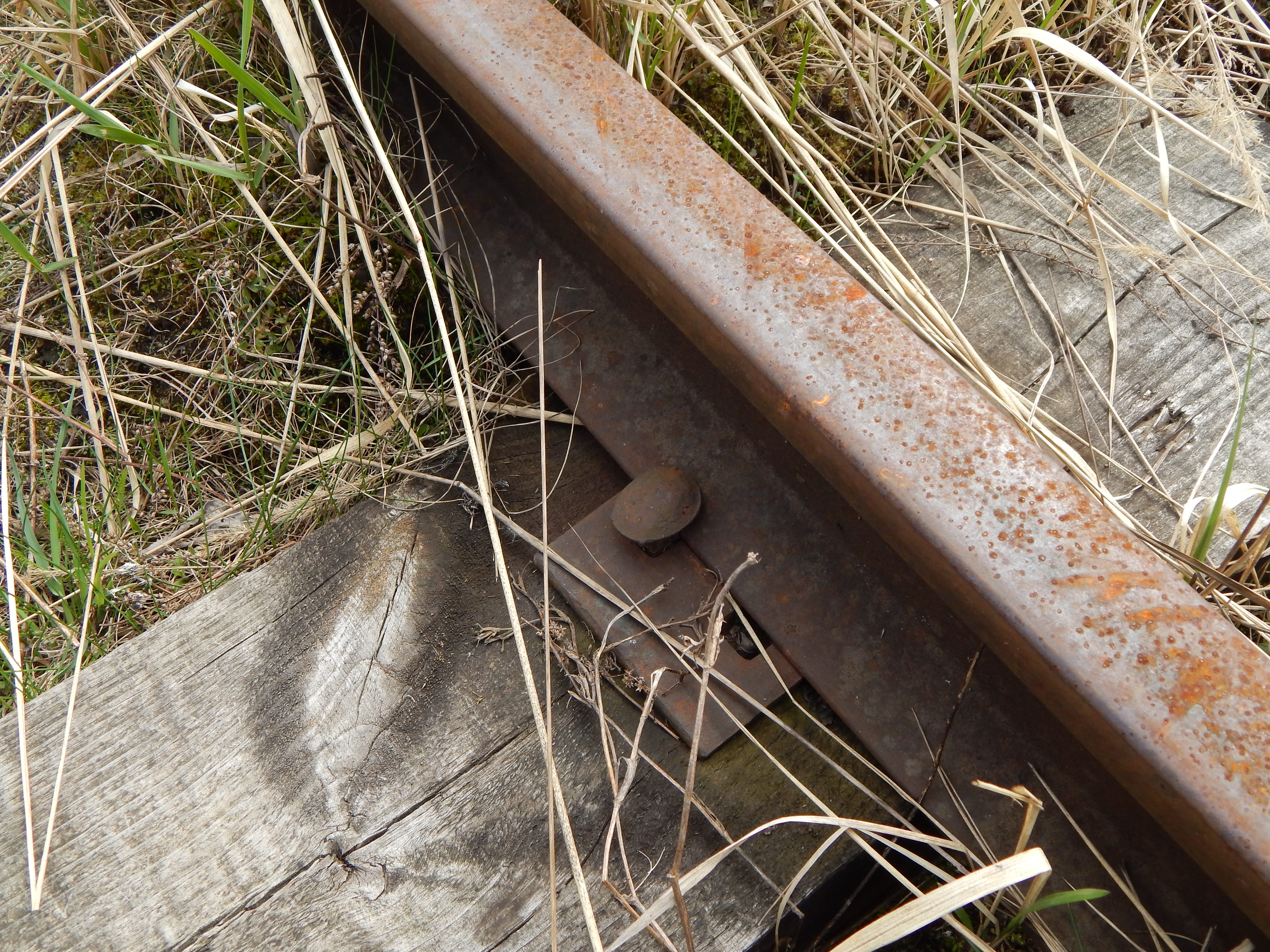
A rail

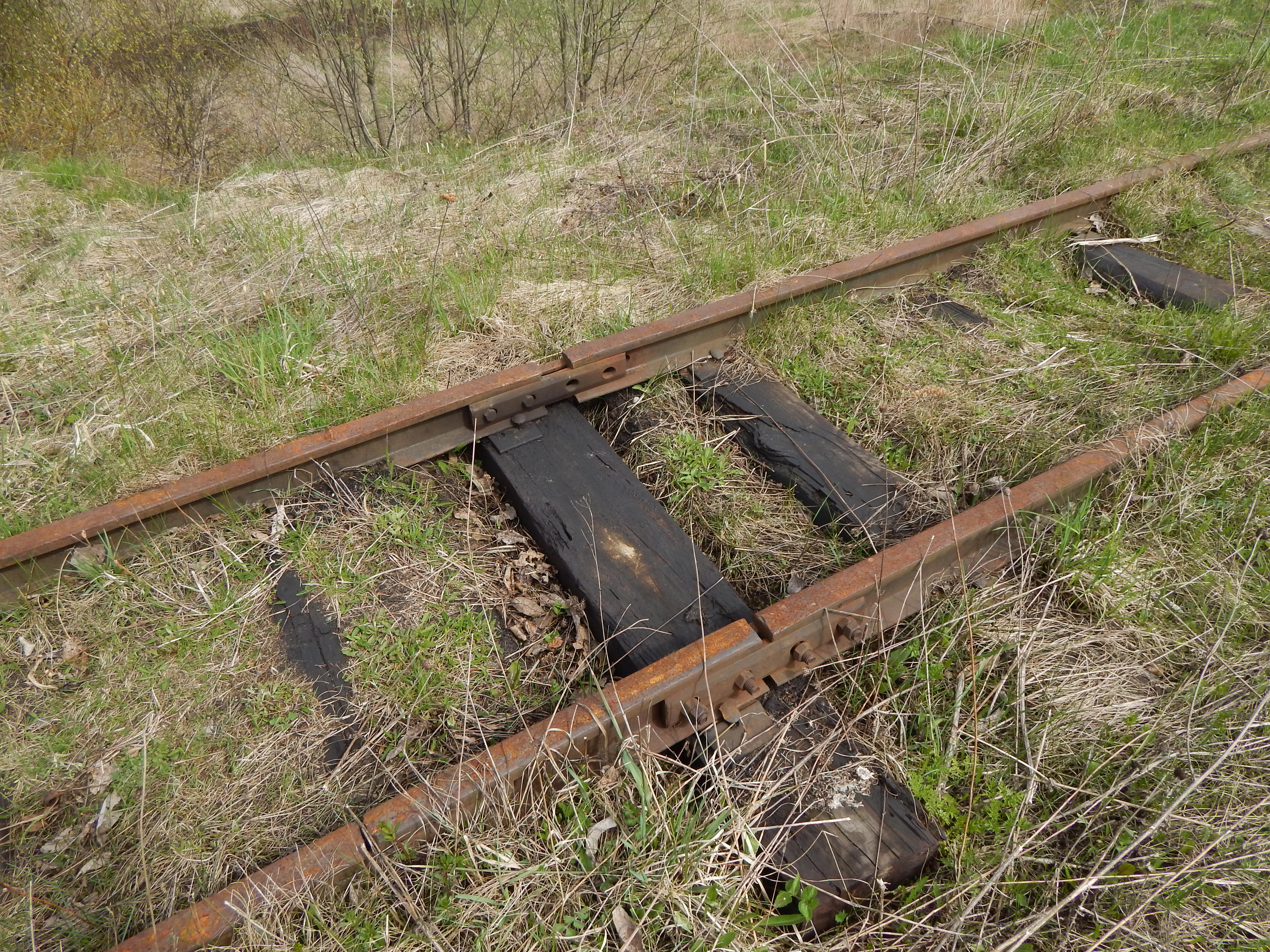
750 mm gauge railways of Zaplyusye's peat company

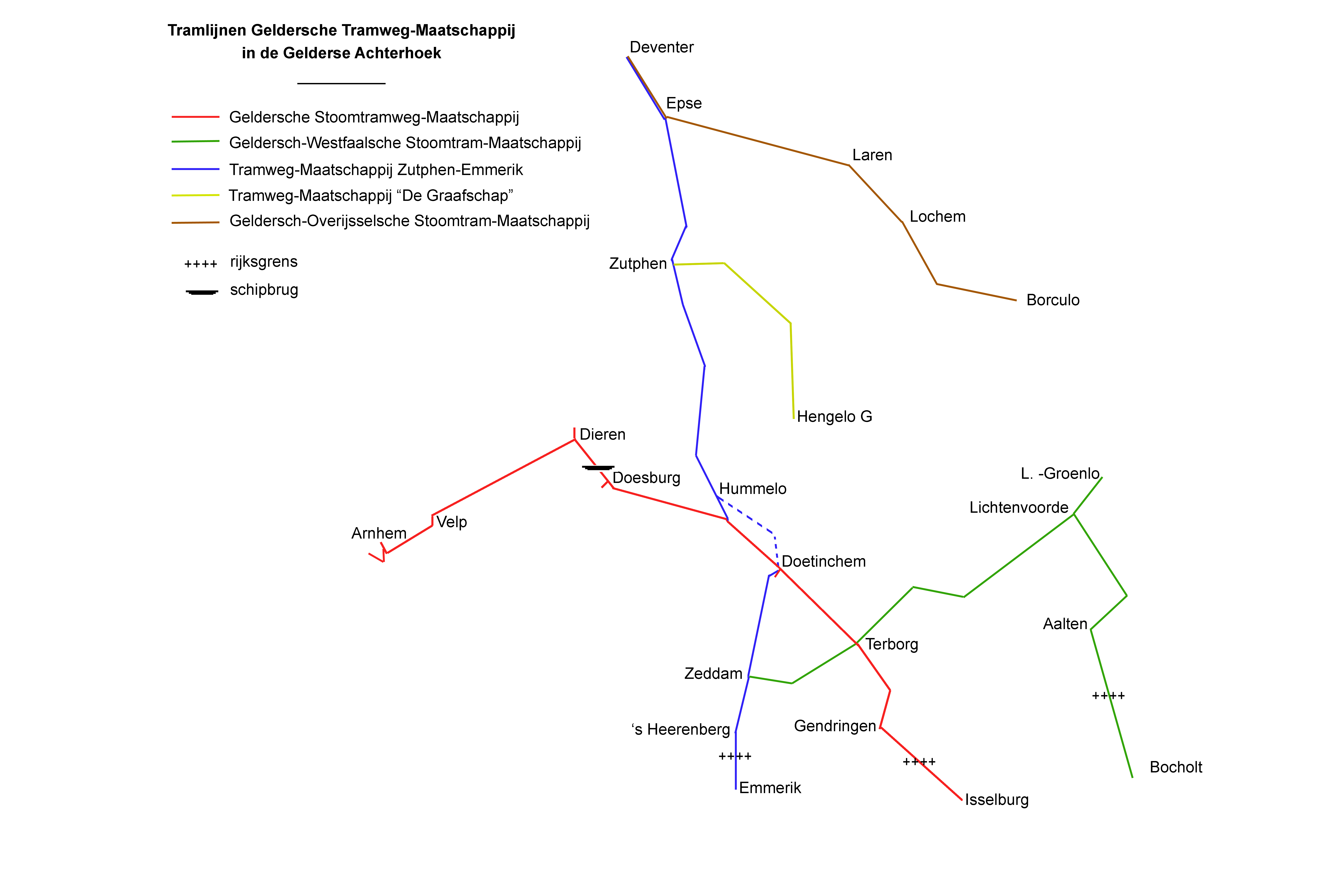
Map of 750 mm (2 ft 5 1/2 in) gauge tramways in the Achterhoek of Gelderland

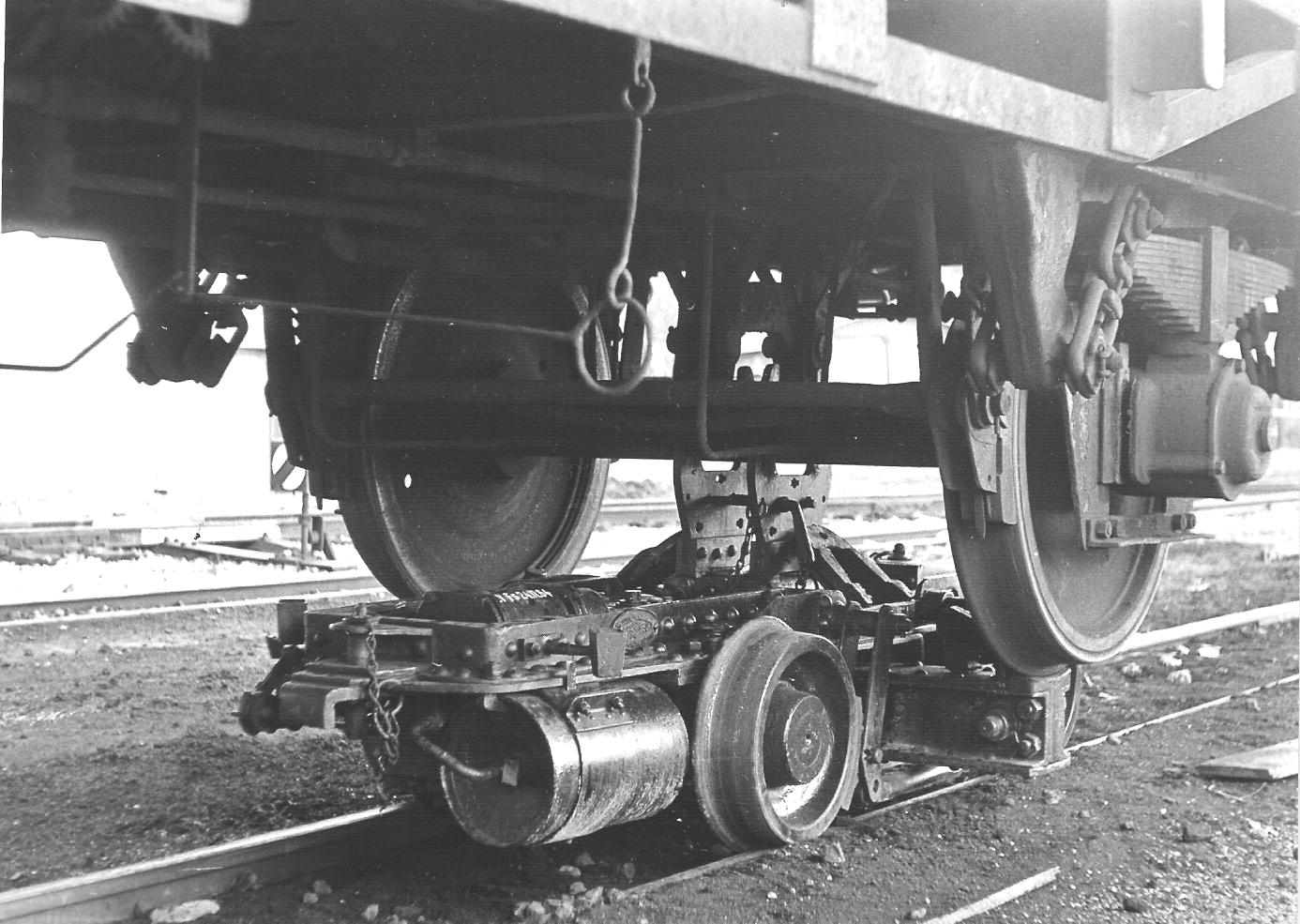
Standard gauge freight cars on Rollbock, 750 mm (2 ft 5 1/2 in) gauge

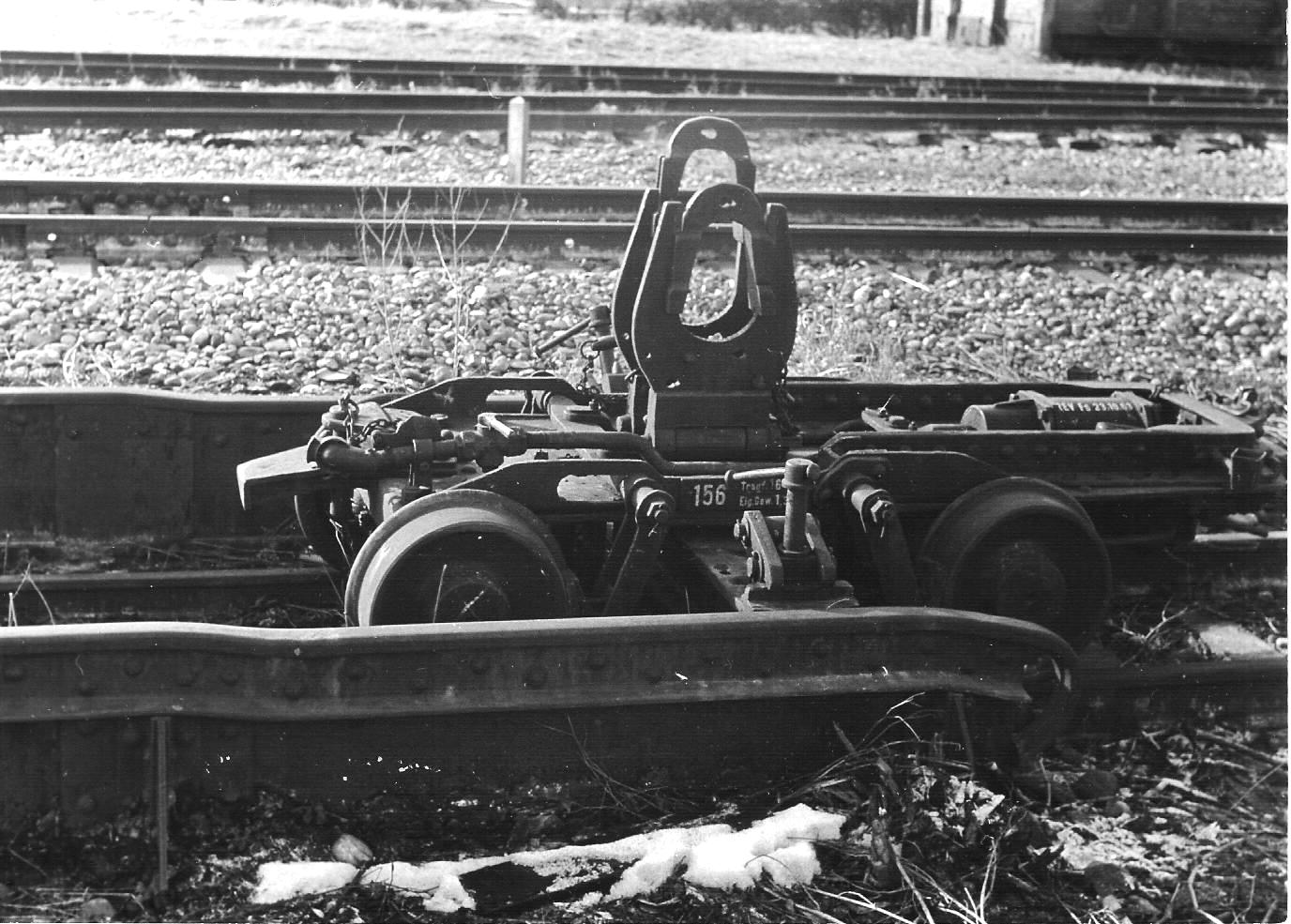
Rollbock track 750 mm (2 ft 5 1/2 in) gauge

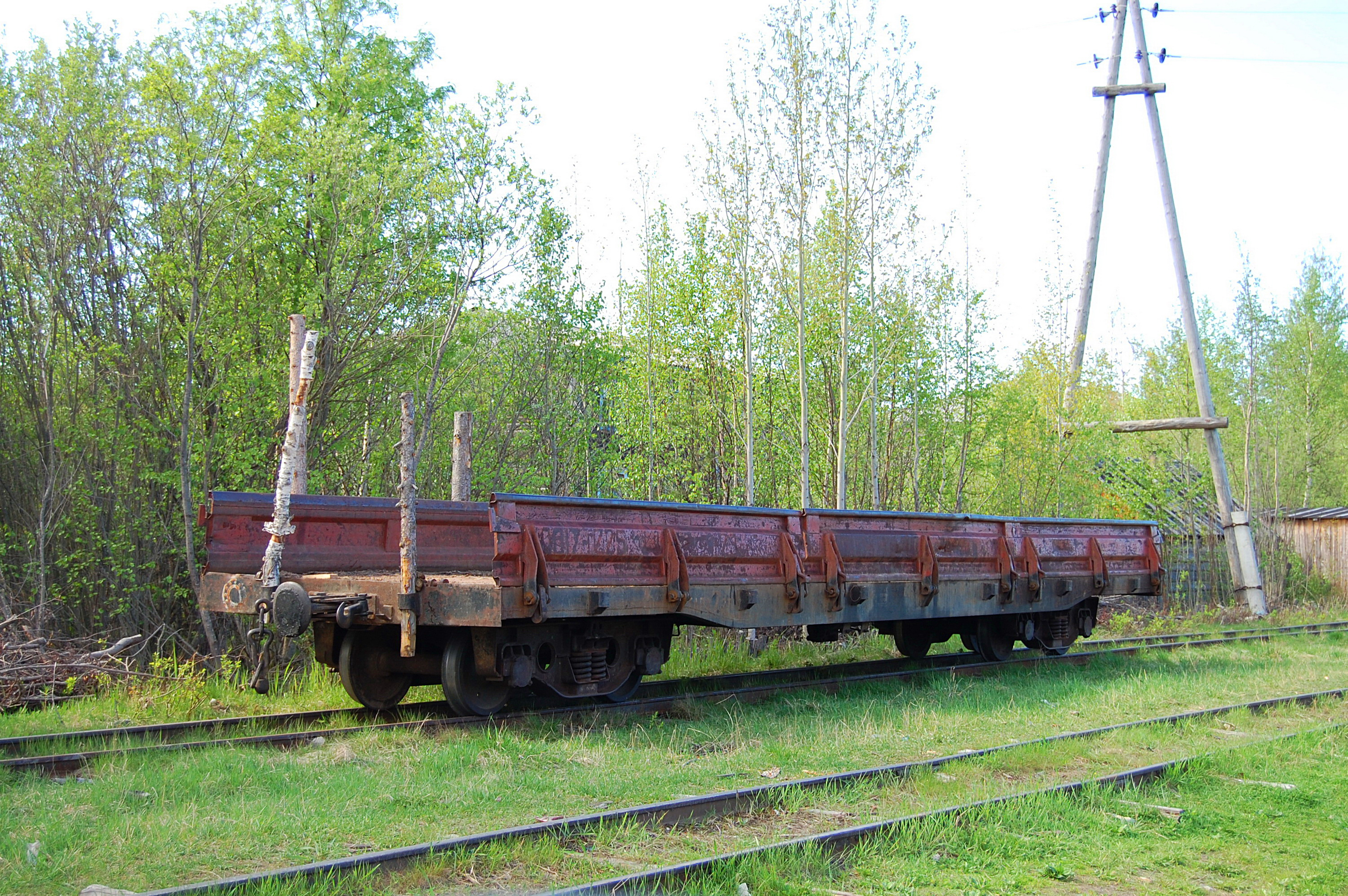
Narrow gauge flat wagons, 750 mm (2 ft 5 1/2 in) & Note single buffer, and two chains each with a hook

== See also ==
- List of secondary, industrial and Decauville railways in Argentina
- List of track gauges
