= Shymkent Children's Railway =

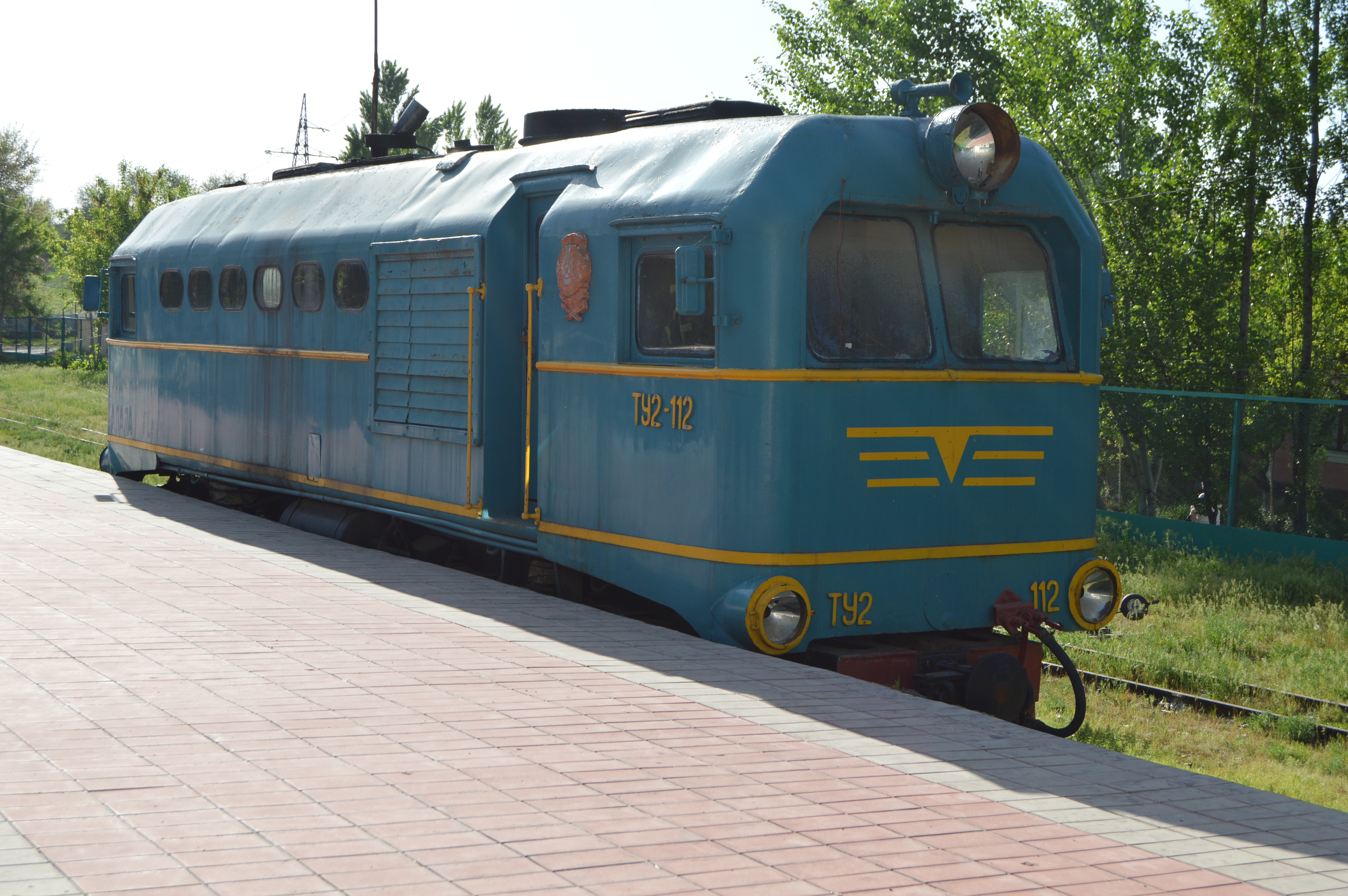
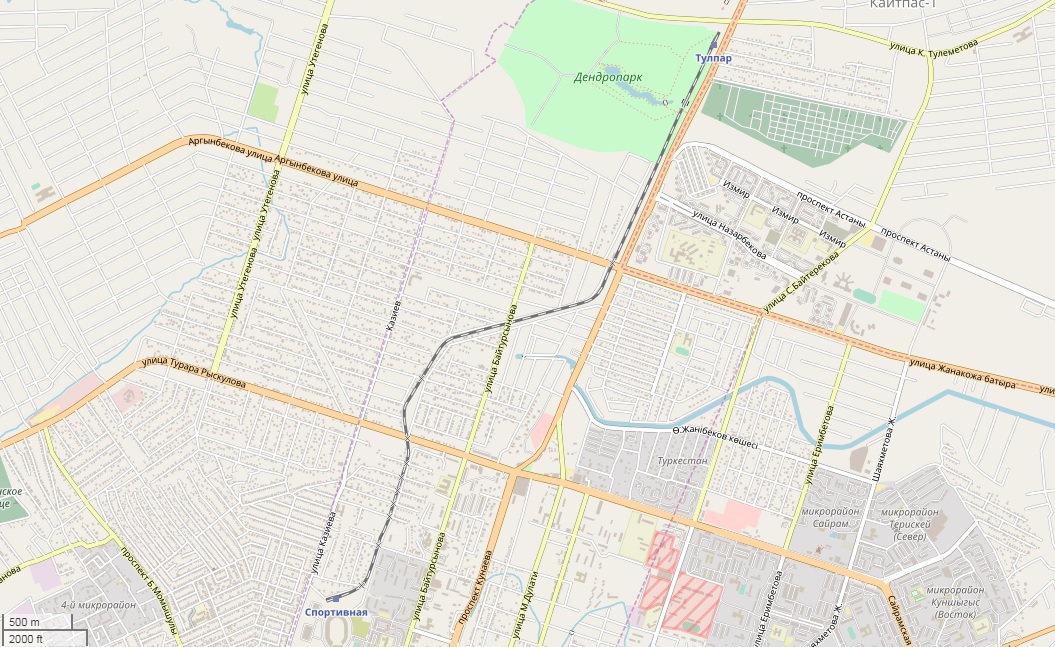
- Diesel locomotive TU2-112 Map

Technical
- Line length: 6 kilometres (3.7 mi)
- Track gauge: 750 mm (2 ft 5 1/2 in)

The Shymkent Children's Railway (Russian: Чимкентская детская железная дорога им. Героя Советского Союза Гани Муратбаева, Tschimkentskaja detskaja schelesnaja doroga im. Geroja Sowetskowo Sojusa Gani Muratbajewa) is a narrow gauge children's railway in Shymkent in Kazachstan. The track with a gauge of 750 mm (2 ft 5 1/2 in) has a length of 6 kilometres (3.7 mi). It has two railway stations. The railway was inaugurated in 1980 as one of the many pioneer railways in the Soviet Union.

== History ==
The children's railway was designed and built by volunteers starting in autumn 1979, the UNESCO proclaimed International Year of the Child. The railway station was designed by Juschgorsel Project Institute (Южгорсельпроект) and the tunnel and the bridge by the Giprofosfor Institute (Гипрофосфор). The architecture of the railway station was nominated for the Lenin Prize. Tulpar railway stations resembles a funny camel, which has the snout of a lions cub for some reason, although Tulpar is actually a winged stallion in Kazach folklore. The first train ran in February 1980, and in May of the same year the railway was regularly used.

== Track ==
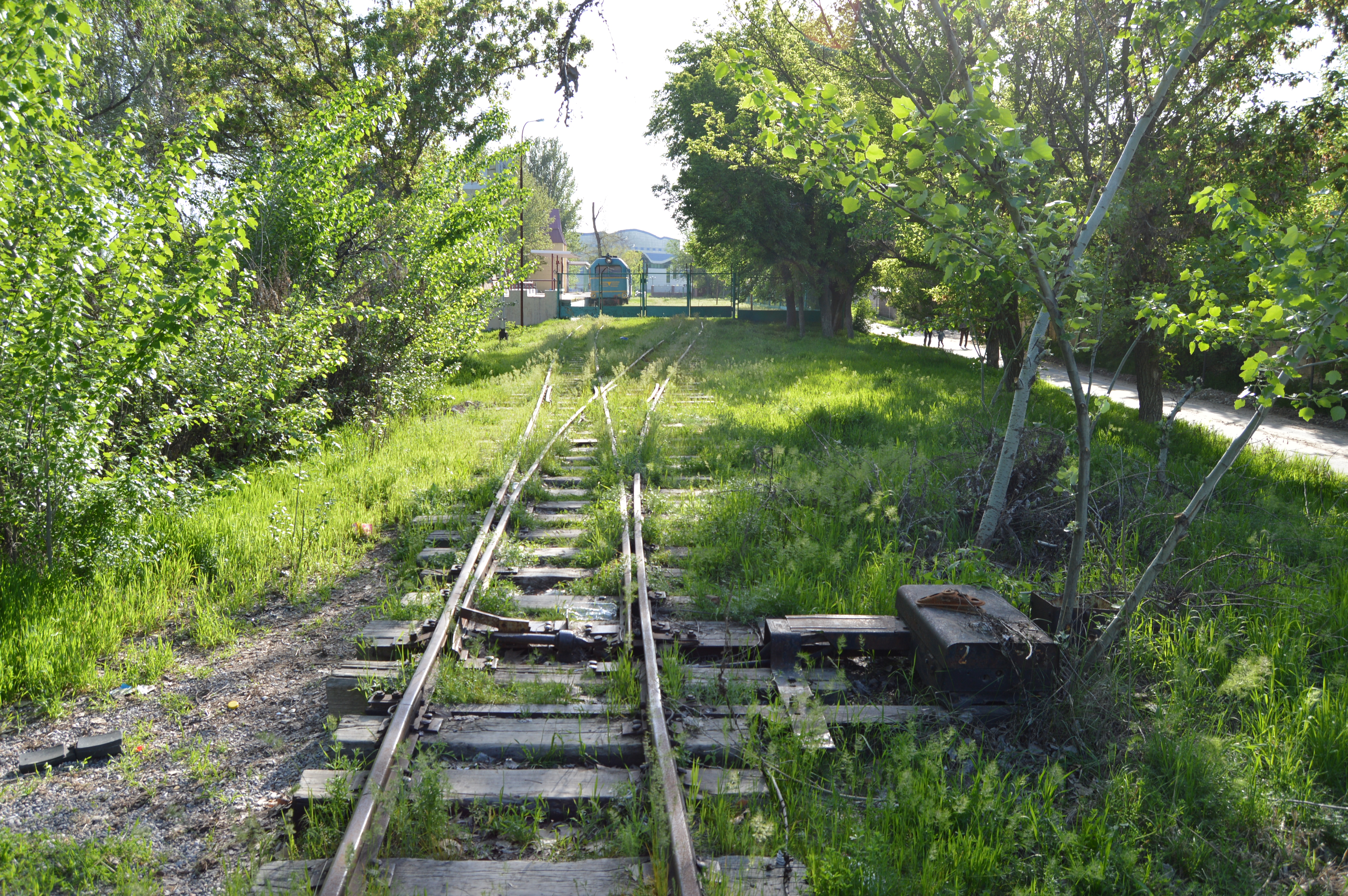
Condition of the track in 2017

The children's railway connects the northern part of the city with a recreation ground with an arboretum, an artificial lake and a zoo. The train runs from the railway station named Sportiwnaja (Спортивная) near the sports stadium via Chadschi Mukan (Хаджи Мукан) to the station named Tulpar (Тулпар) near the entrance of the zoo. Initially, the children's railway was nearly the only way to get to this recreation ground, and thus it was used by 176,000 passengers in the months from May to September of year of its inauguration.

The track has a complex height profile: Immediately after passing the bridge behind Sportivnaya is a nearly 2 kilometres (1.2 miles) long incline with two sharp radii. There is also an approximately 25 metres (27 yd) long tunnel, a cable-stayed bridge and another bridge.

== Rolling stock ==
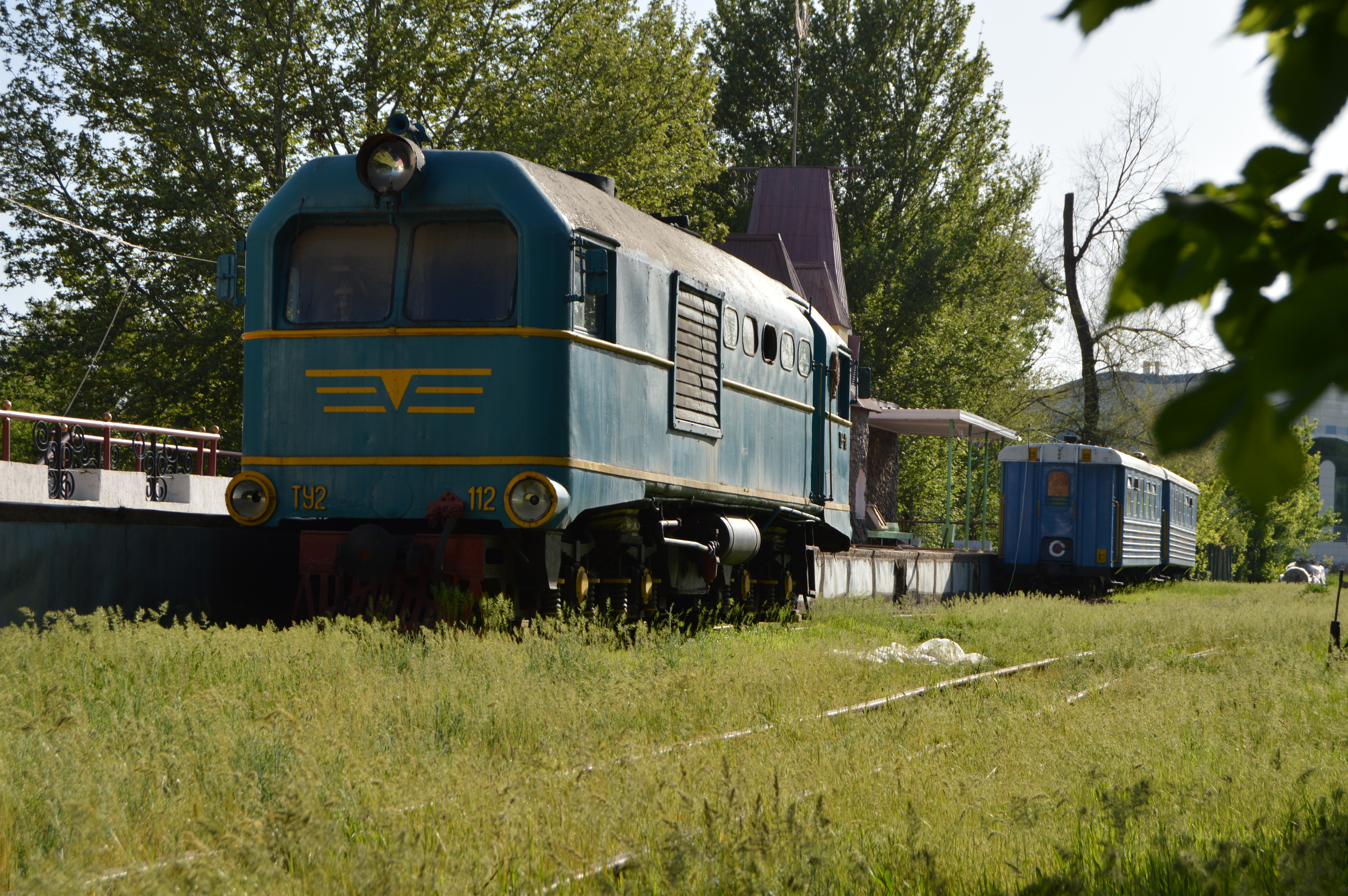
TU2 diesel locomotive-112 and two PW51 carriages, 2017

One TU2 diesel locomotive stems from the Alma-Ata Children's Railway, the other from the mine and smelter Atschpolimetall (Ачполиметалл) in Kentau. Two PW51 carriages of the Demichovsk factory are used for passenger transport. Some of the older Pafawag carriages are mothballed in Sportiwnaja railway station, some of them are used occasionally as back-up. The TU2-269 locomotive was decommissioned for spares. Even so, there is a significant lack of spare parts. In summer 2003 the railway had to be closed temporarily twice due to maintenance issues of the locomotive. 2010 it was in use, and even longer than in previous years, because it started operating in April.
