= Red Monarch =

1983 British film by Jack Gold

- Written by: Charles Wood
- Directed by: Jack Gold
- Starring: Colin Blakely; David Suchet; David Kelly; Carroll Baker; David Threlfall
- Country of origin: United Kingdom
- Original language: English

Production
- Producer: David Puttnam
- Cinematography: Mike Fash
- Running time: 100 minutes

Original release
- Release: 16 June 1983

Red Monarch is a 1983 British television film, starring Colin Blakely as Joseph Stalin. It is directed by Jack Gold and features David Suchet as Lavrentiy Beria and David Threlfall as Stalin's son Vasily.

== Plot ==
Red Monarch is a black comedy based on The Red Monarch: Scenes from the Life of Stalin, a collection of short critical essays by the Russian dissident and former KGB agent Yuri Krotkov. The film depicts Soviet politics and the interplay between Stalin and his lieutenants, particularly Beria, during the last years of Stalin's rule. The reading of Yevgeny Yevtushenko's "The Heirs of Stalin" in the final scene supposedly warns that the threat of totalitarianism is constantly present.

Throughout the film, Stalin and Beria's accents are Irish, intended to single them out as Georgian. This is the natural accent of Colin Blakely and is put on by David Suchet. Most of the others actors have northern English accents, seen as stereotypically working class.

== Box office ==
Goldcrest Films invested £553,000 in the film and earned £292,000 making them a loss of £261,000.

== Cast ==
- Colin Blakely as Joseph Stalin
- David Suchet as Lavrentiy Beria
- Carroll Baker as Ellen Brown
- Ian Hogg as Shaposhnikov
- David Threlfall as Vasily Stalin
- Nigel Stock as Vyacheslav Molotov
- Lee Montague as Lee
- David Kelly as Sergo
- Glynn Edwards as Nikolai Vlasik
- Peter Woodthorpe as Georgy Malenkov
- Brian Glover as Nikita Khrushchev
- Oscar Quitak as Lev Mekhlis
- Wensley Pithey as Kliment Voroshilov
- George A. Cooper as Lazar Kaganovich

== See also ==
- The Death of Stalin
