= Yerevan Children's Railway =

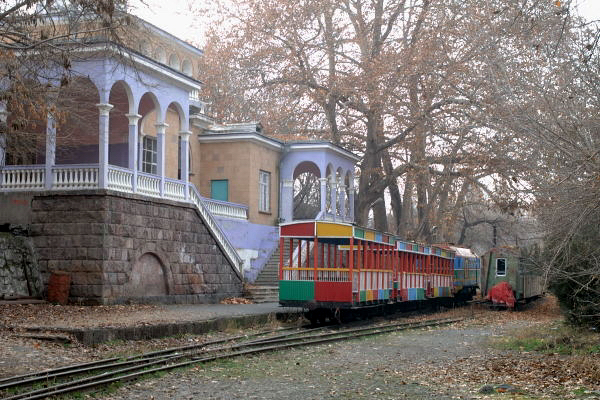
- Hayrenik station platform in 2008

Overview
- Status: Closed
- Coordinates: 40.1866°N 44.5005°E

History
- Opened: 9 June 1937
- Closed: 6 July 2024

Technical
- Line length: 4.2 km (2.6 mi)
- Track gauge: 750 mm (2 ft 5 1/2 in)
Route map
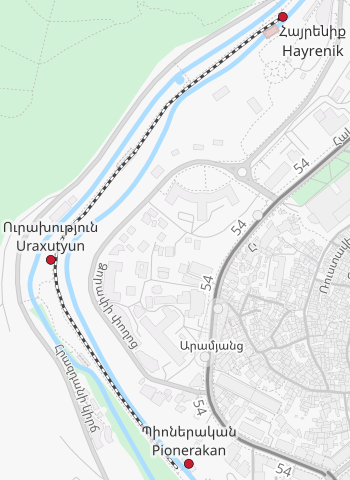

Yerevan Children's Railway (Armenian: Երևանի մանկական երկաթուղի) is a 2.1-kilometre-long (1.3 mi) narrow gauge railroad loop passing through the Hrazdan gorge in Yerevan, Armenia. It is one of many children's railways that existed in the Soviet Union and continued functioning after its breakup. The master plan for the railway and the old wooden station building were designed by architect Mikael Mazmanyan in 1937. The current main station building was designed and built by architect Goar Grigoryan and Babken Sedrak Hakobyan in the late 1940s.

The railway was opened on 9 June 1937 and was in operation until 2024, no longer as an educational institution, but as a park railway operated by adults. In July of the same year, a decision was made to close it for operation. As of 2024, the railway is not functioning, the locomotives are inoperative, and the stations are closed.

== History ==
In 1935, the First Secretary of the Communist Party of Armenia Aghasi Khanjian proposed the construction of the children's railway in Yerevan. In December 1935, the construction of the Yerevan Children's Railway was included by the USSR State Planning Committee in the annual economic plan for 1936.

According to the project, the railway was supposed to be extended to pass over a bridge that would be built across the Hradzan River, stretching for additional one and a half kilometers, climbing to the top of Tsitsernakaberd as a funicular. These plans weren't realized.

On 22 April 1936, during the subbotnik in the city park on the left bank of the Hrazdan, attended by more than 10 thousand Komsomol members, a ceremony took place, in which Khanjian and the Minister of Railways of the Armenian SSR Babken Amatuni laid the foundation stone of the main station.

The deadline for the completion of the project was set for 7 November 1937, yet the construction of the railway was completed four months ahead of schedule. On 9 July 1937, a train, consisting of locomotive 159-434, donated by the Voroshilovgrad Locomotive Plant, and three in-house made open passenger carriages, set off for the first time. Initially, a wooden building of the main station was constructed but at the end of the 1940s, a new one was built in its place out of tuff.

In March 1959, the railway received two all-metal passenger carriages PAFAWAG. In 1971, it received a TU2-116 diesel locomotive.

In the 1990s, after the collapse of the USSR, the road ceased to be a children's railway. It was serviced by adults, and only operated on weekends, when the nearby amusement park was open. The train (sometimes consisting of one carriage) passed the Uraxutyun platform without stopping and stopped near the Pionerakan station. Since almost nothing was left of it, passengers did not leave the carriage, and the train immediately returned to the beginning of the route with its carriages facing forward.

In 2012, South Caucasus Railway carried out repair works of the railroad infrastructure. In April 2024, Russian "RID" holding, tasked with restoring the railway, announced its decision to abandon the project, citing the lack of cooperation from the local authorities. The railway was closed in July of the same year.

== Facilities ==
The Children's Railway has two terminal stations—Hayrenik (main) and Pionerakan—and one intermediate platform—Uraxutyun—as well as a 45-metre-long (148 ft) tunnel. During the last decades of operation, only Hayrenik station was in use. The railway utilizes 750 mm gauge. Total length of the track is 2.1-kilometre-long (1.3 mi). Two unused 400-metre-long (1,300 ft) tunnels connect the railway park with the city center.

Since the mid-1980s, signaling and blocking devices have not been used on the railway, although masts from semaphores have been preserved. Due to the lack of a second track, the train returns with its carriages facing forward. For this reason, the passing track at the Hayrenik station was used only for parking rolling stock.

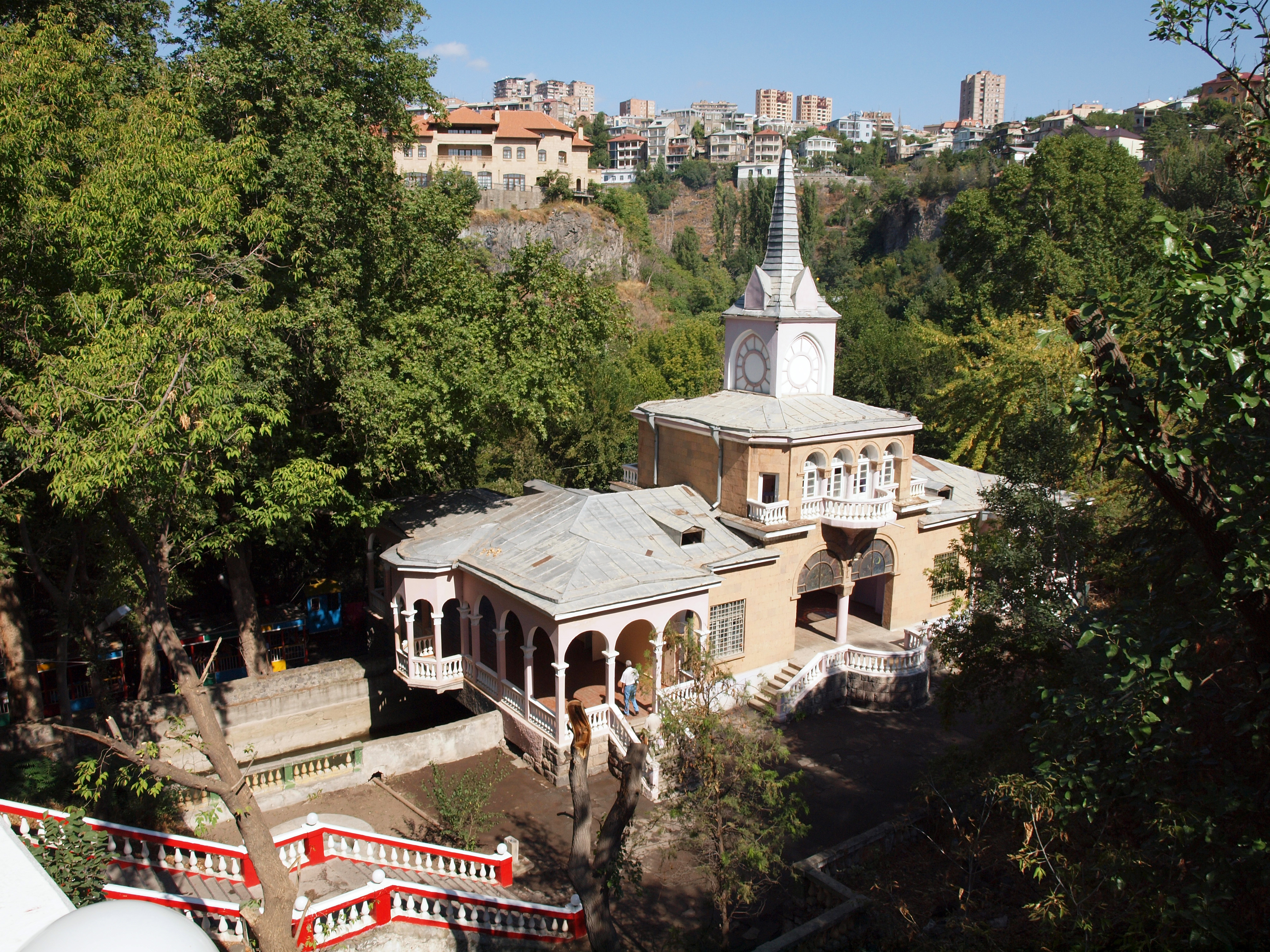
Hayrenik station

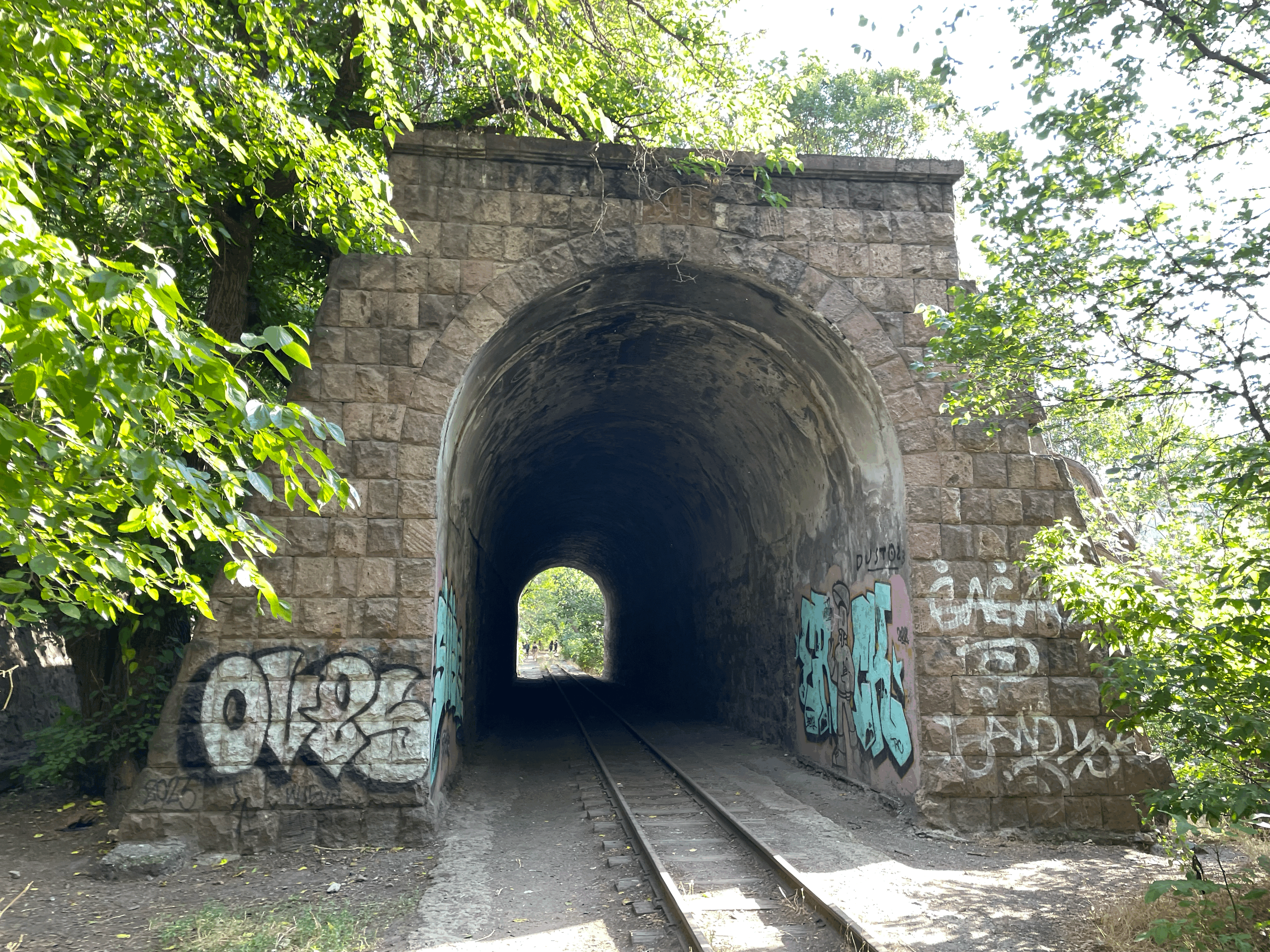
Decorative tunnel

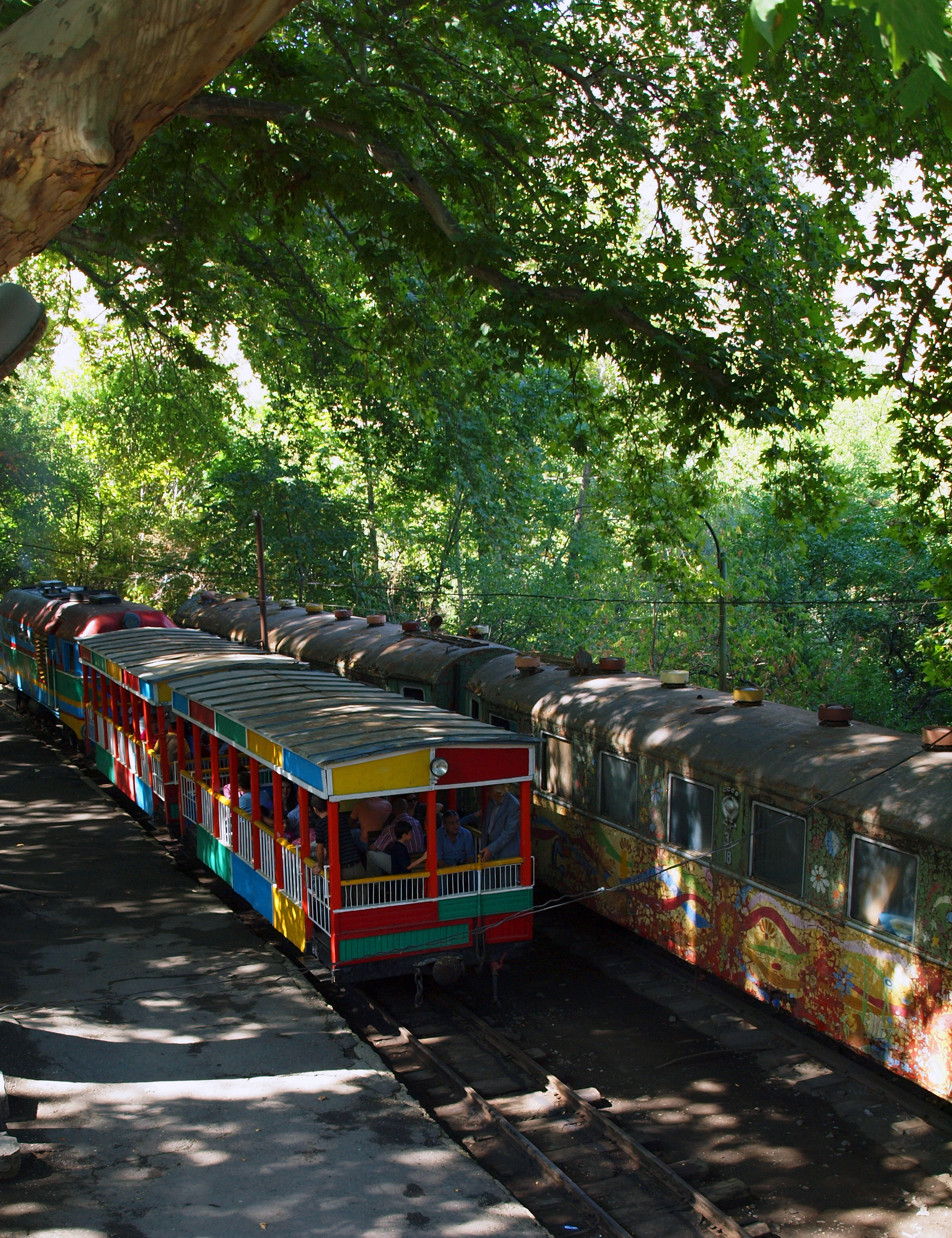
Passenger carts

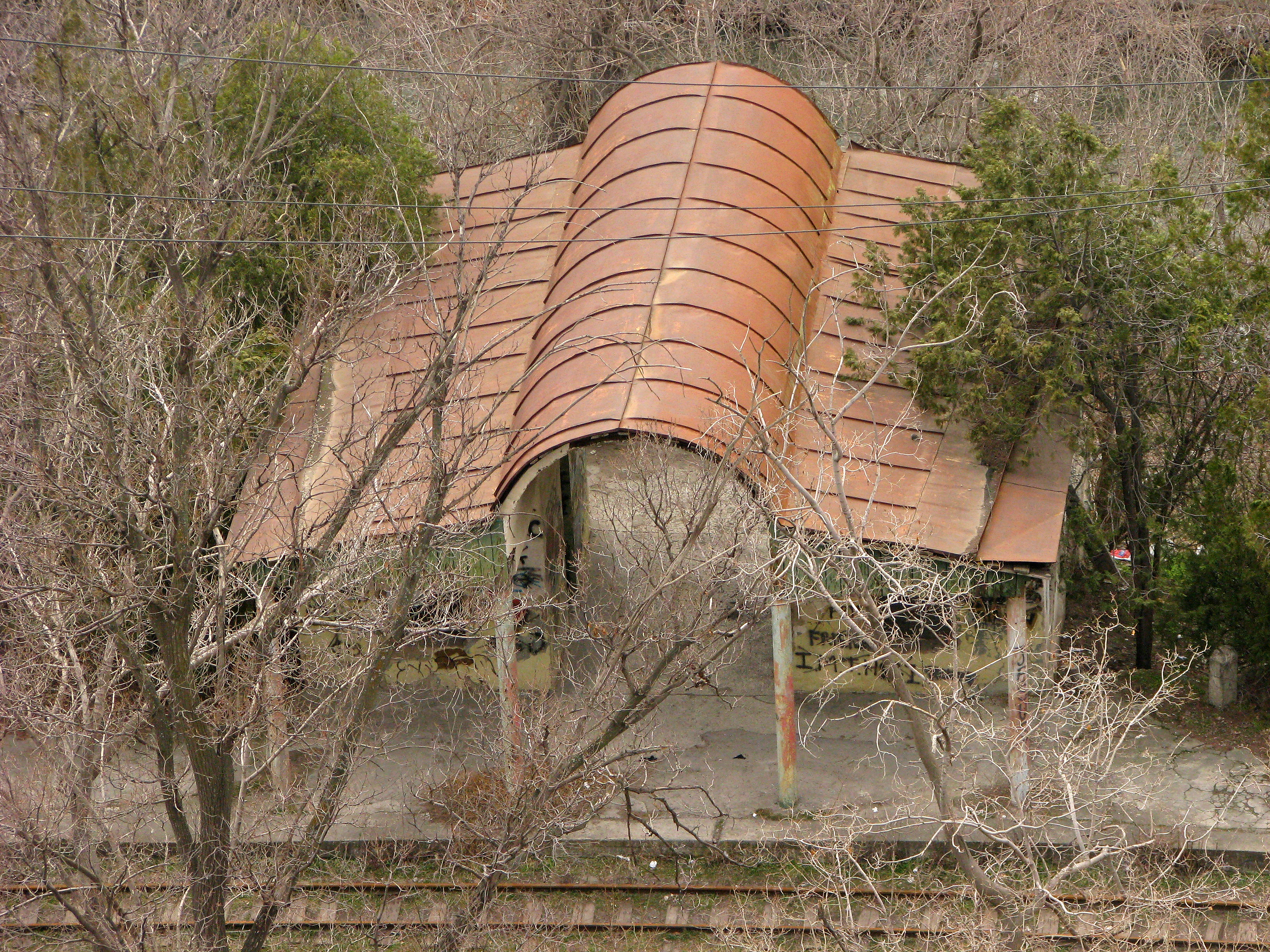
Uraxutyun platform

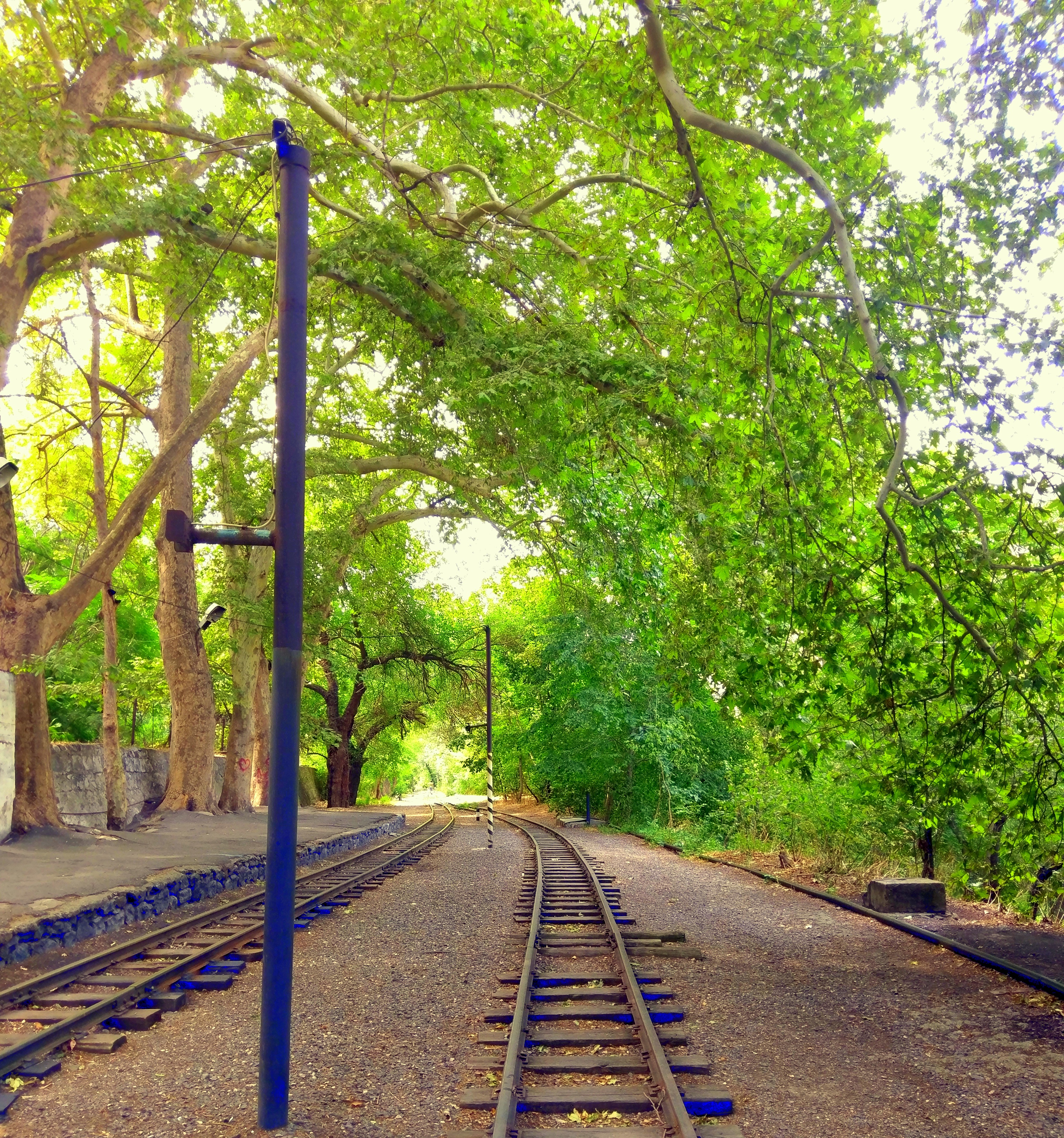
Tracks

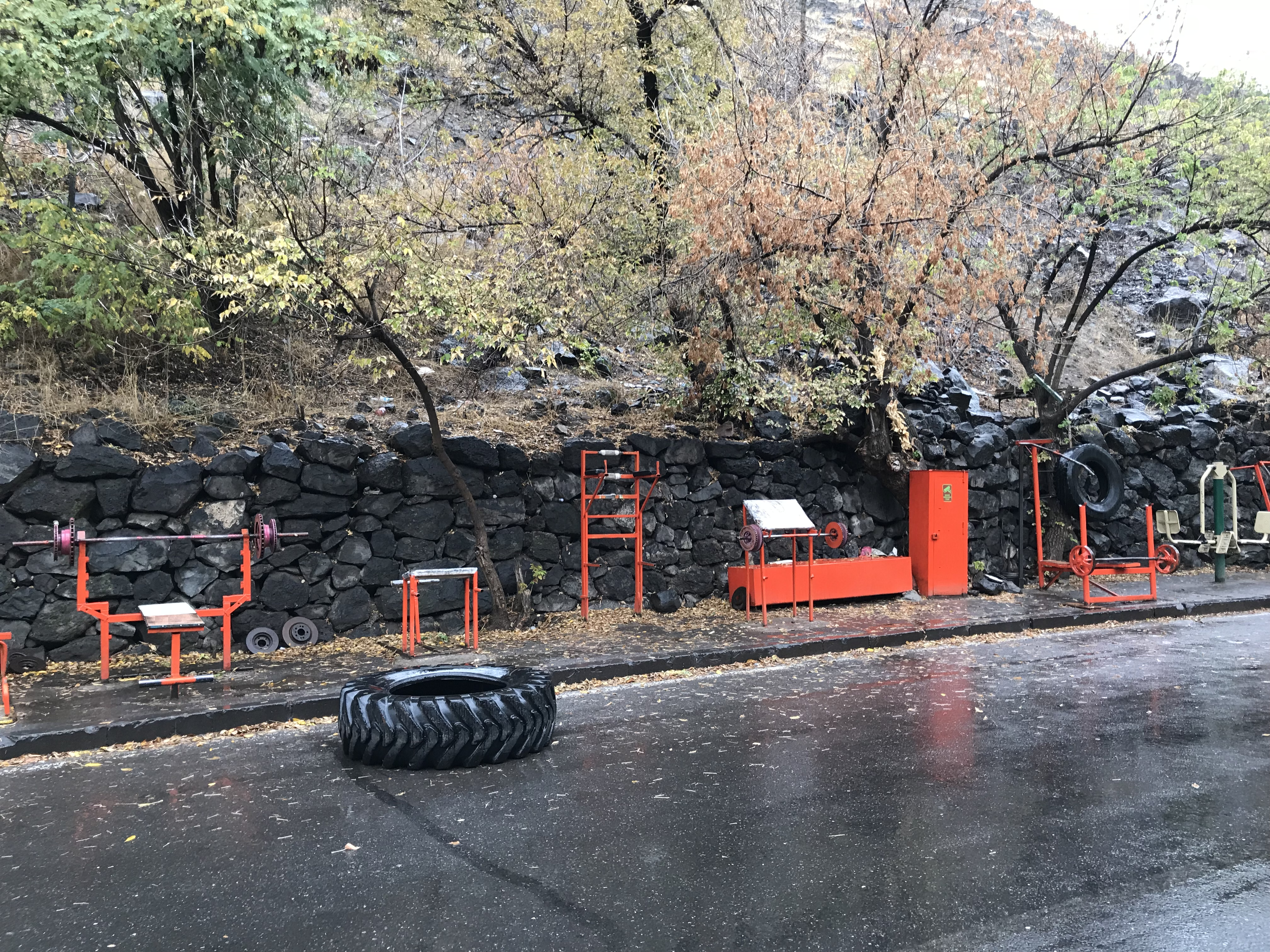
Outdoor gym in the adjacent park

== Sources ==
- Fadeev, G. M.; Kraskovskiĭ, E.; Uzdin, M. M., eds. (1994). Istoriia zheleznodorozhnogo transporta Rossii (in Russian). Sankt-Peterburg; Moskva: AO "Ivan Fedorov". ISBN 978-5-85952-005-3
