= Karaganda Children's Railway =

Railway in Kazakhstan

Coordinates: 49.8000°N 73.0750°E

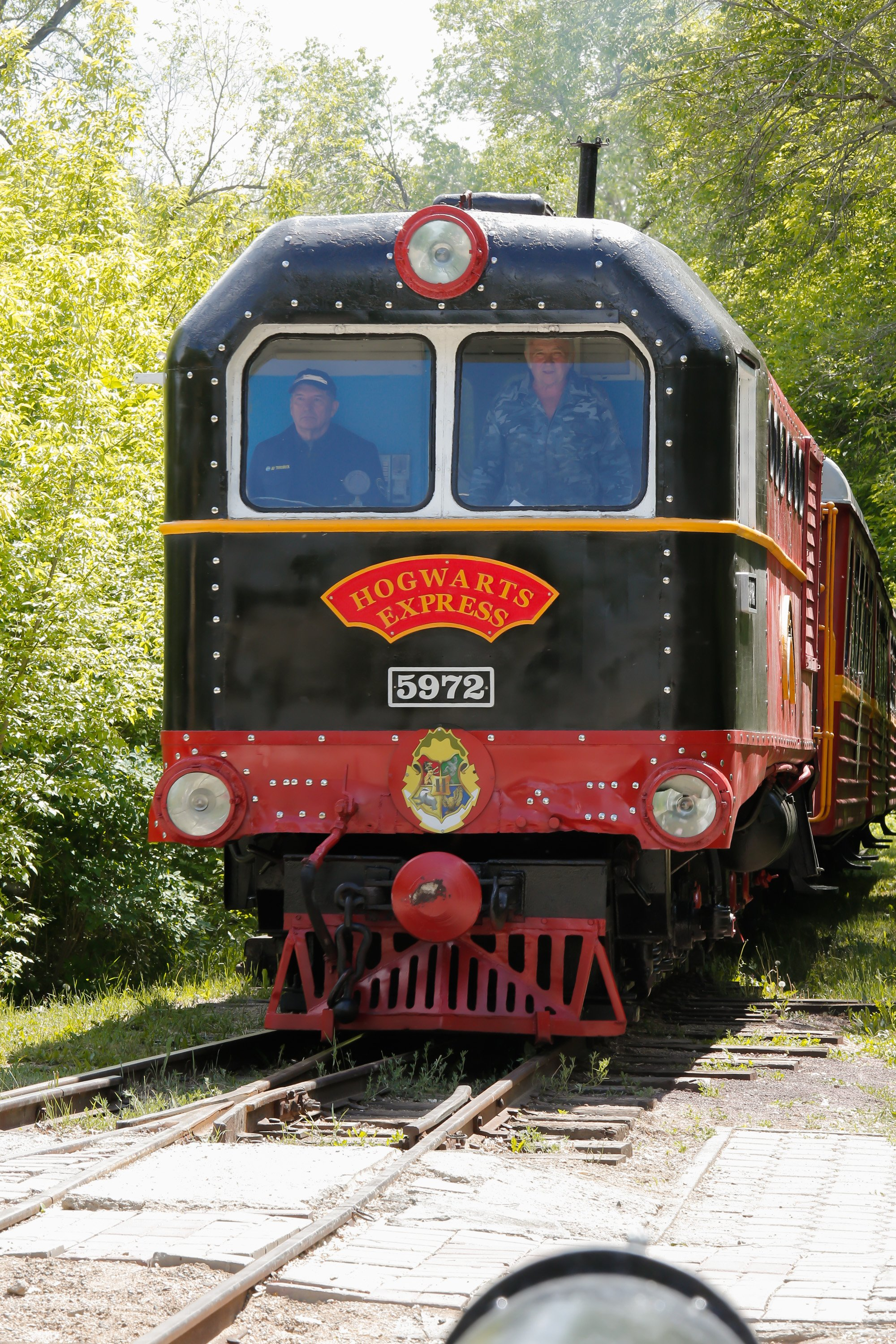
Diesel locomotive TU-111 entering Arman station

Karaganda Children's Railway (kazakh: Қарағанды балалар темір жолы, Qaraghandy balalar temir zholy) is a narrow gauge children's railway in Karaganda (or Qaraghandy) in Kazakhstan. The 5.1 kilometres (3.2 mi) long track has a gauge of 750 mm (2 ft 5 1/2 in). It has two railway stations with wooden station buildings. It was inaugurated on 1 May 1957 as one of the many pioneer railways in the Soviet Union. It was temporarily closed in 2001–2004 and 2006–2007. In July 2007, May 2008 and August 2009 it was in operation.

== History ==
On 22 August 1956, the Day of the Miner, several test runs were conducted on the originally only 1.8 kilometres (1.1 mi) long track, but regular use began only on 1 May 1957. Initially, the locomotives were moved to the other end of the train in the dual track Pionerskaja railway station, but at the Komsomolskaja railway station there was a balloon loop. Both stations were equipped with wooden station buildings. That of Komsomolskaja is preserved, but that of Pionerskaja existed only to late 1960s or early 1970s. Now, there is only the small brick building of the station master.

In the era of steam locomotives the trains consisted of three light wooden carriages with a length of less than seven or eight metres each. These were replaced by metal body carriages, probably in the 1960s, and later by three Polish Pafawag carriages. Around 1990 the five local carriages were replaced by longer Polish carriages, and the platforms had to be extended accordingly.

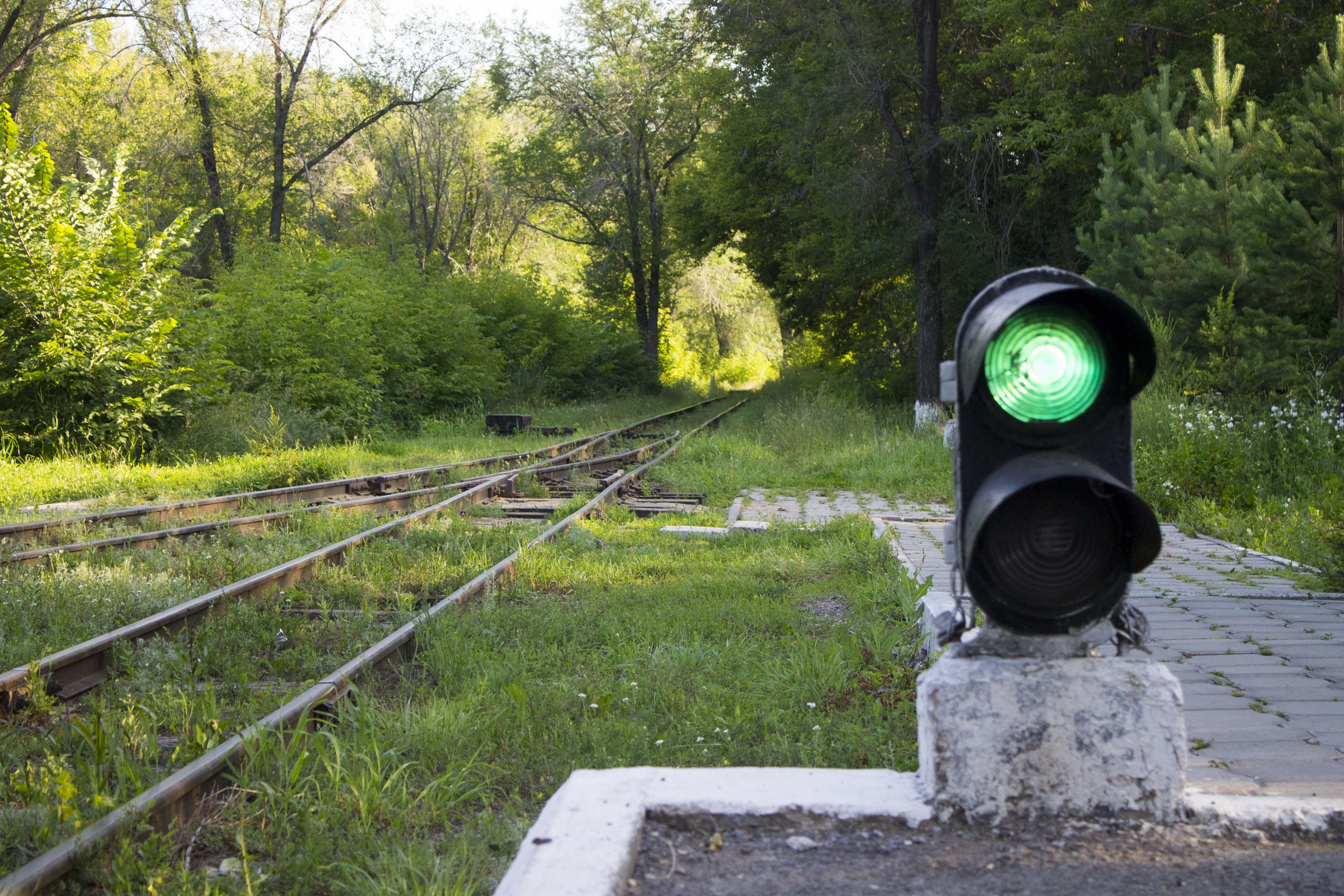
Modern light signals

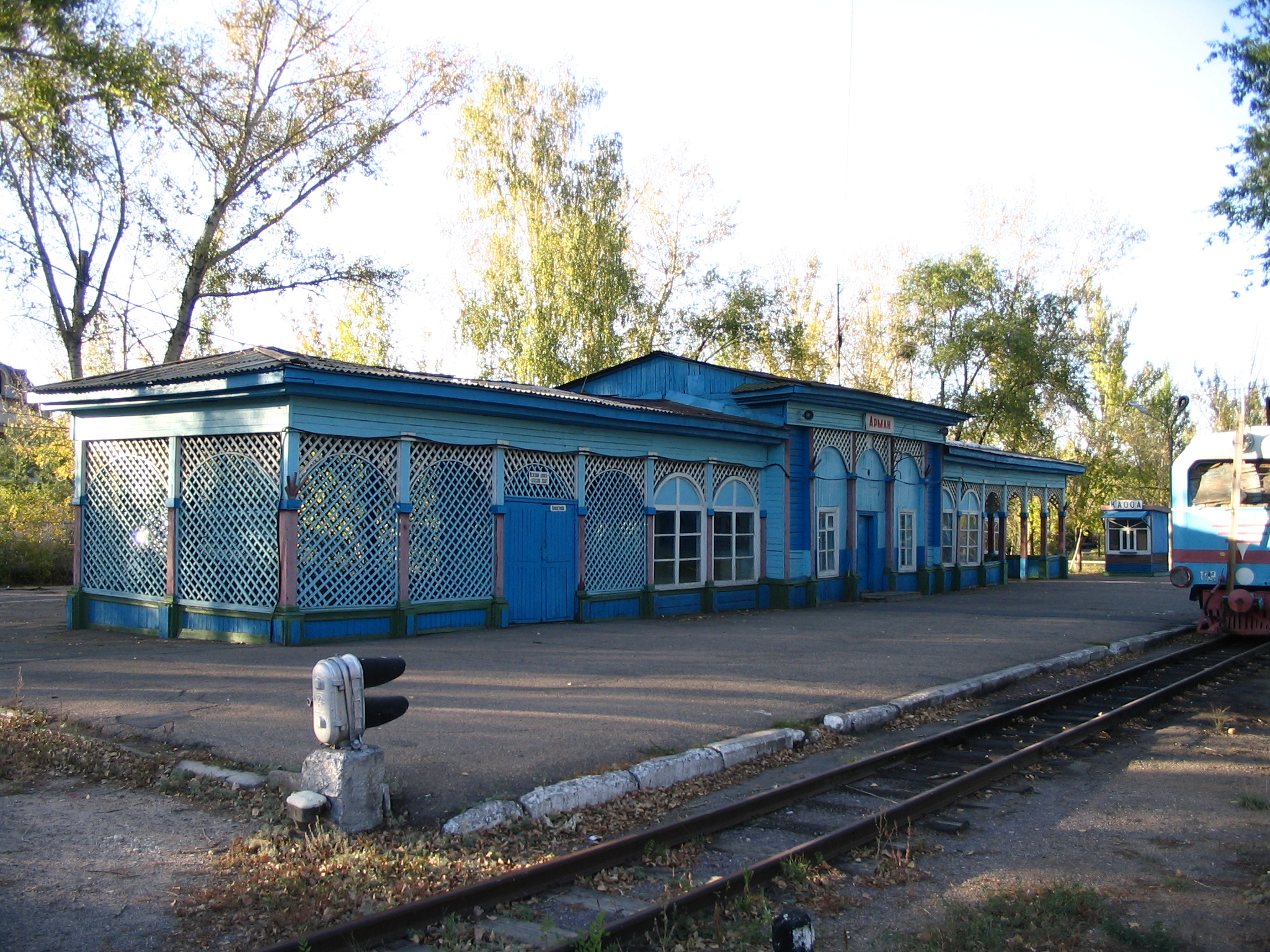
Arman railway station, 2006

During the renovation of the track, the signal system was also modernised. In the 1990s Komsomolskaja railway station was renamed to Arman, and Pionerskaja railway station, which got relocated at that time, got the name Druzhba.

At the end of the 1990s, Karaganda Children's Railway was threatened by failure due to financial problems, as many former pioneer railways in Kazakhstan. In winter 2000 the governmental railways Kazakhstan Temir Zholy informed the management of the children's railway about the pending termination of further payments. When the management of Ispat-Karmet (Испат-Кармет), the successor of the Karagandaer smelter (Карагандинский металлургический комбинат), which had their own locomotives and carriages, heard about the financial problems, they requested to re-animate the children's railway. Surprisingly, the management of the government railways subsequently provided the required funds for repairs and maintenance of the track, infrastructure and rolling stock of the children's railway.

Season 2001 ran without problems. To increase the profit, a wedding train was introduced similar to that of the Qostanai Children's Railway (Кустанайской ДЖД). Even so, the children's railway was not profitable. THus the management of the government railways ceased their payments. In November 2001 most of the personnel of the children's railway was made redundant, and the director was given a position as security guard. The government railways Kazakhstan Temir Zholy sold the children's railway to a subsidiary, which tried to sell it a year later, potentially even for scrap. In summer 2004 the local aksakal requested that the akimat should re-instate the children's railway. After lengthy arguments, the government railways were persuaded, to repair the children's railway once again. On 1 August 2004 it was re-opened for the public. End of December 2004 it was transferred free of charge to the Office of Parks of Culture and Recreation. Since then, the budget of the provincial government allocates a budget for its maintenance.

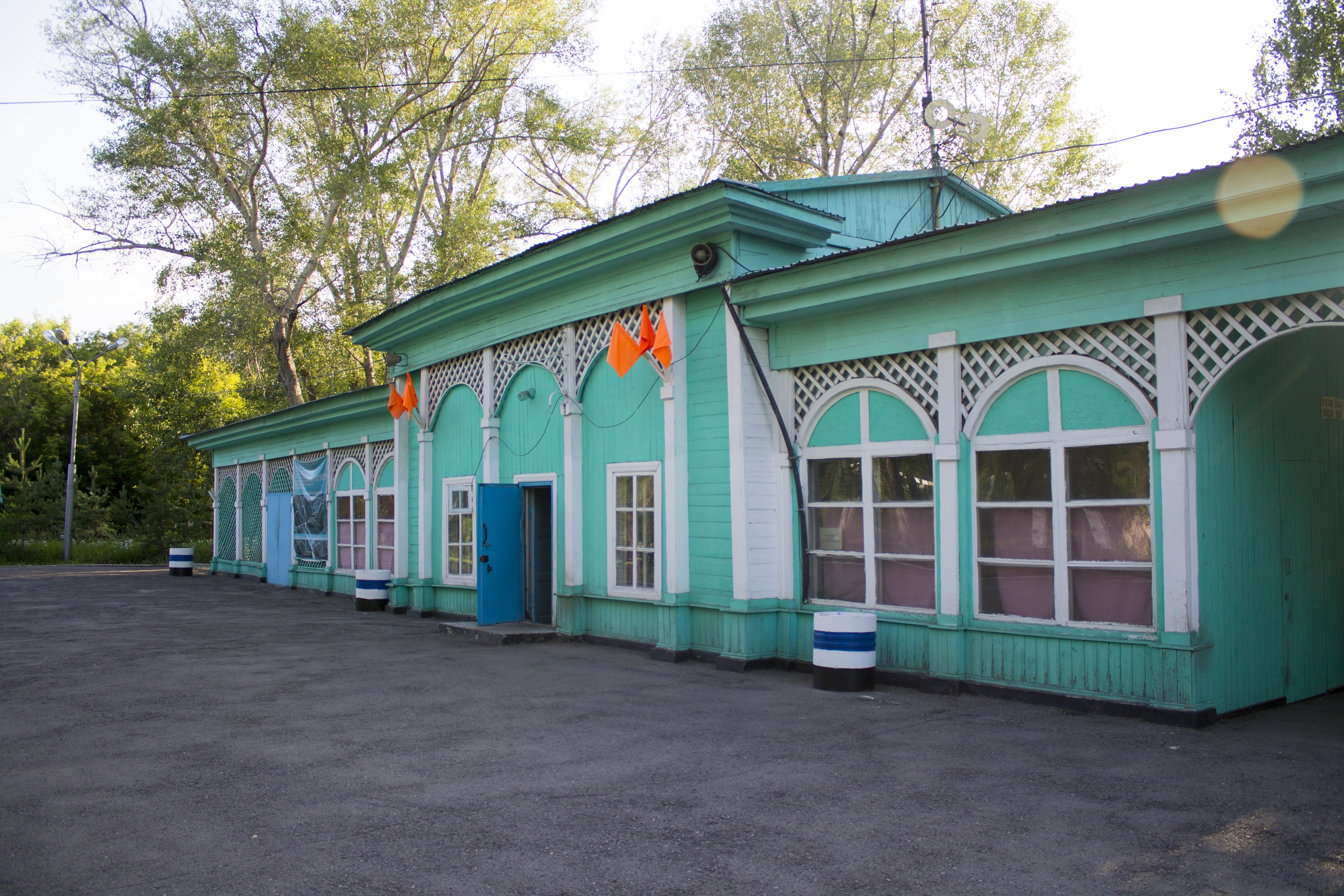
Arman railway station, 2016

In summer 2004 the railway was operated by adults, because it was not possible, to find enough sufficiently qualified youths, after years of stand-still. The provincial government has difficulties to maintain the railway without the support of the government railway. Consequently, the children's railway did not operate in 2006 and the first half of 2007. During this time, the track was damaged by inappropriate construction work, when new pipelines were laid through the park, but in July 2007 both the track and the rolling stock had been repaired, and the service was re-instated by adults, although without the obligation to train youths to become future railway employees.

== Rolling stock ==
Initially the trains were moved by the steam locomotive WP1-805-27, which had previously probably belonged to an industrial railway, according to the unusual number. In or before 1961 the children's railway receive the diesel locomotive TU2-115. The diesel locomotive TU2-037 was acquired in the early 1970s. It had to be overhauled in 1987–1989, and at that time the children's railway got the diesel locomotive TU2-111 from the Qostanai Children's Railway, which is still being used. In addition there are three wooden carriages and at least three metal carriages of an unknown manufacturer as well as three Polish Pafawag carriages.
