= Baku Children's Railway =

Coordinates: 40.391977°N 49.847575°E

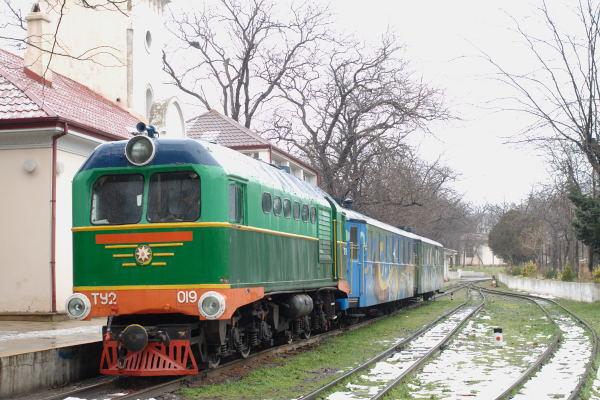
- Locomotive TU-019 of Baku Children's Railway

Technical
- Line length: 1.05 kilometres (1,050 m)
- Track gauge: 750 millimetres (30 in)

The Baku Children's Railway (Azerbaijani: Azərbaycan Dövlət Uşaq Dəmir Yolu) was a narrow gauge children's railway in the Azerbaijan capital Baku. It runs through Shakhriyar Park (formerly Dzerzhinkiy Park) on a 1.05 kilometres (1,050 m) long line with a gauge of 750 millimetres (30 in) between two terminus stations. The railway was opened on 10 August 1947 as one of the many pioneer railways in the Soviet Union. It was taken out of service and dismantled in June 2009.

== History ==
The idea of building a children's railway in Baku dates back to 1945 when the decision of the Council of Ministers of Azerbaijan on 15 June 1946 defined the beginning and end of the construction of the railway. Construction began on 14 March 1947 and ended on 1 May 1947, the railway line was located in Dzerzhinsky Park (later Shahriyar Park). Pupils and students from Baku also helped to build the railway. About 120 young railway workers were involved in the work. The opening of the Baku Children's Railway took place on 10 August 1947, The first manager of the Baku Children's Railway was M. Achundov. The Zoopark station had three tracks so that the locomotives could be moved to the other end of the train. The railway station Bagar had a triangle for turning the trains, which was later dismantled.

== Design ==
According to the construction plan, two phases were originally planned. The first section in Dzerzhinsky Park led to the Republican Stadium, which existed there until 2009, and the second section should have led to the Montin settlement so that the railway would have had a total length of 4 km. But the second section was not built. So there was only the 1,050 meters (0.65 mi) long distance from Dzerzhinsky Park to the Republican Stadium.

During the early 1990s, the children's railway lost importance and was removed from the list of Azerbaijani State Railways. As a result, it was in crisis. Since January 2002, however, interest in the Baku Children's Railway has again increased, and the decision of the 1990s has been classified as wrong. The warehouses were repaired and modernized, the rails were renewed in some places, and the signals and contacts were completely repaired. In June 2002, the line was put back into operation after the repair work.

In June 2009 the children's railway in Baku was shut down and dismantled and brought to the Bilajari reservoir in order to rebuild it from time to time, but this has not yet been done.

== Rolling stock ==
Diesel locomotives

- ТU2 – TU2-019, TU2-206

Steam locomotives

- K.7 (Typ 86, Kolomna Locomotive Works)
- 159-141

Carriages

- 6 Pafawag carriages
