= Alma-Ata Children's Railway =

Coordinates: 43.25803°N 76.96885°E

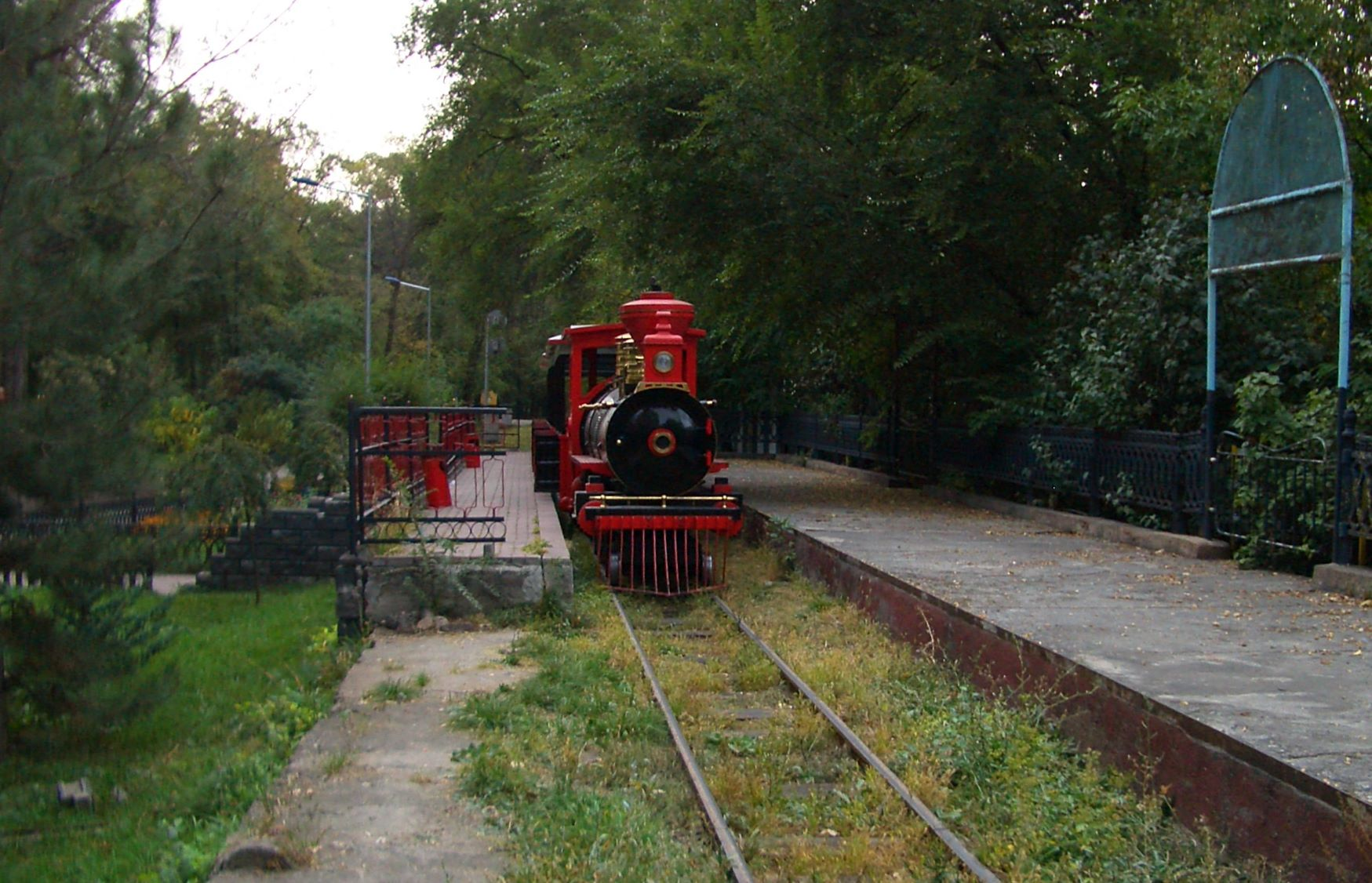
- Italian Diesel locomotive, 2007

Technical
- Line length: Main route: 1.24 km (0.77 mi); Total: 1.47 km (0.91 mi)
- Track gauge: 750 mm (2 ft 5 1/2 in)

The Alma-Ata Children's Railway (Russian: Алма-Атинская детская железная дорога, romanized: Alma-Atinskaya detskaya zheleznaya doroga) is a narrow-gauge children's railway in Almaty, Kazakhstan, which was called Alma-Ata from 1921 to 1993. The main route of the track had a gauge of 750 mm (2 ft 5 1/2 in) and a length of 1.24 km (0.77 mi). It was inaugurated on 13 September 1952 as one of many pioneer railways in the Soviet Union and on 20 July 1997 it was temporarily decommissioned. Since 2006 it has operated as a ridable miniature railway for entertainment rather than an educational purpose.

== History ==
In the summer of 1952, the Pioneer Organization and the Komsomol of Alma-Ata built the 1.24 km-long (0.77 mi) railway loop, a wooden platform, and a wooden station building in Alma-Ata's Central Park. Initially, the overhauled Kolomna type 63/65 locomotive UP-40 and two self-built wooden passenger carriages were used. The rolling stock was replaced in 1958 by a TU2 diesel locomotive and three Pafawag-built metal passenger carriages. The same year, a new building for the Section Manager and the dual track Komsomolskaya railway station were inaugurated.

Four PV40 (PV51) Kazakh railway carriages were acquired in the mid-1980s, and the diesel locomotive TU7A-2921 was acquired in 1986. Both railroad switches at the Komsomolskaya station were equipped with electric actuators in 1993. Pavlik Morozov station was renamed Dostyk (Kazakh for "friendship") and Komsomolskaya station was renamed Zhastar ("youth"). In 1995 wireless communication were installed between the stations and locomotives. The Kazakh government railway Kazakhstan Temir Zholy transferred the railway to the city council, which manages Central Park. The City Council suspended operations on the railway on 20 July 1997 due to commercial considerations. Within a month, the locomotive was vandalised and the carriages were removed from the track to be used as sales pavilions.

== Current use ==
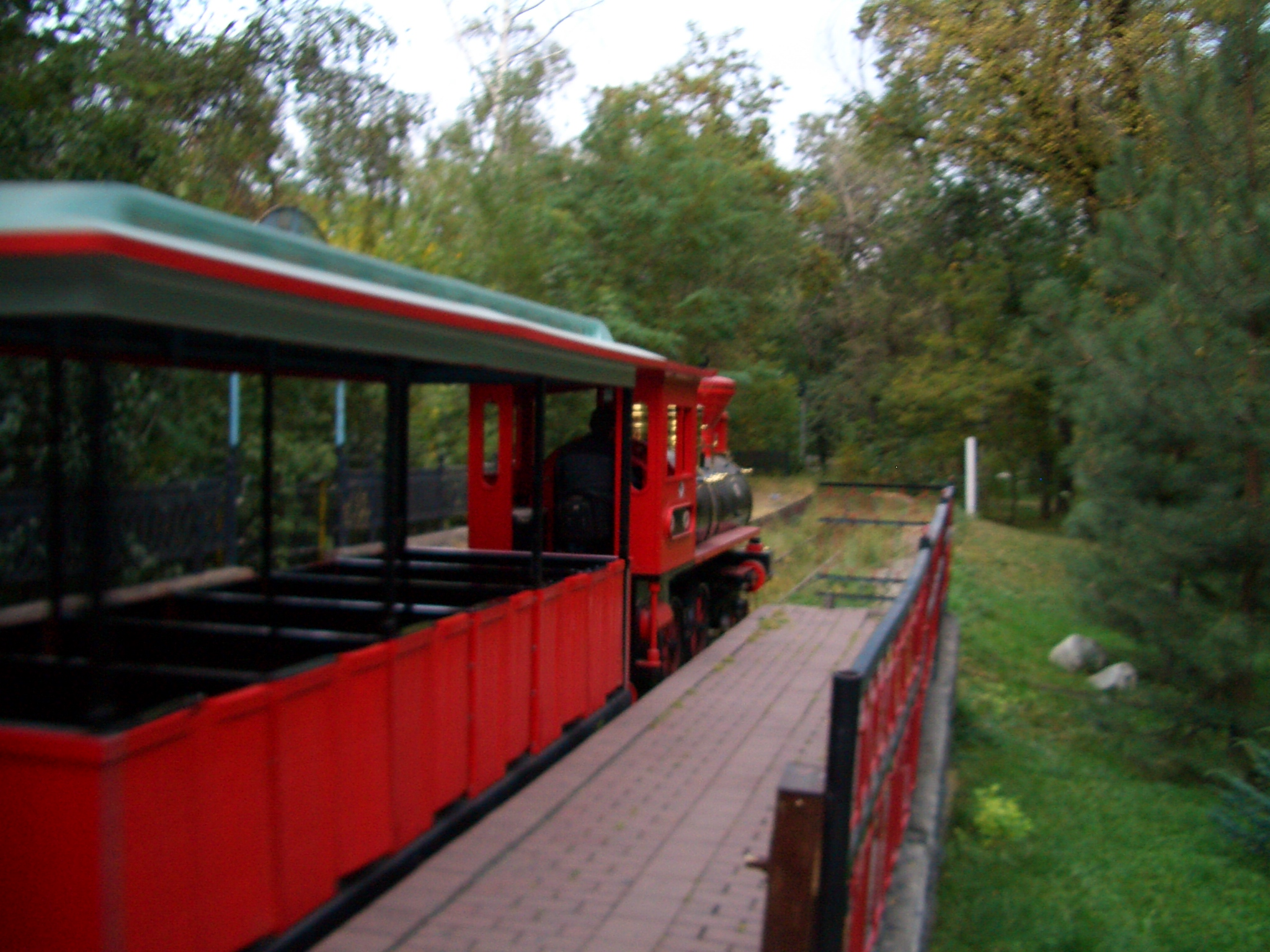
Modern rolling stock of the children's railway, 2007

Central Park was privatized in 1999, and the track and one of the stations was subsequently restored. The railway currently operates as a private enterprise using a miniature Italian diesel locomotive built to look like a steam locomotive with three open carriages. A fake tunnel that is too small for any of the traditional locomotives or carriages has been erected over the railway track. Prior to entering the tunnel, actors playing Native Americans sometimes pretend to attack the train. Inside the tunnel, the railway sometimes puts on a puppet show. At the end of August 2001, the wooden Dostyk station building burned down.

== Cultural significance ==
Russian railway enthusiasts complain that the Alma-Ata Children's Railway has changed from an educational organisation, where children and youths were educated to become future railway workers, to a conventional ridable miniature railway, where children are just customers and do not take responsibility for operating the railway. However, it is the only children's railway in Kazakhstan, and its operation and ridership have been stable since privatization.
