= FC de Onda al Grao de Castellon y Villareal-Puerto de Burriana =

Spanish narrow gauge railway

FC de Onda al Grao de Castellón y Villareal-Puerto de Burriana

Overview
- Status: Closed
- Locale: Province of Castellón, Spain
- Termini: Grao de Castellón; Onda

Service
- Type: Narrow-gauge railway
- Rolling stock: 12 steam locomotives (0-6-0T and 0-6-2T types), 35 passenger cars, 172 freight cars

History
- Opened: 1888
- Closed: 1963

Technical
- Track length: 43 km (27 mi)
- Track gauge: 750 mm (2 ft 5 1/2 in) (narrow gauge)

The FC de Onda al Grao de Castellon y Villareal-Puerto de Burriana was a Spanish 750 mm (2 ft 5 1/2 in) gauge narrow gauge railway that operated over 43 kilometres of track between 1888 and 1963, when the system closed. Opening dates of the various sections are as follows:

Main line 29 km

Grao de Castellon – Casellon de la Plana 1888–1963.
Casellon de la plana – Vilarreal 1889–1963.
Villarreal – Onda 1890–1963.

Branch line 14 km.

Vilarreal – Burriana 1907–1956, reopened 1960–1963.
Burriana – Grao de Burriana 1907–1936.
Burriana – Porto de Burriana 1948–1956.

At closure the railway had 12 steam locomotives of 0-6-0T and 0-6-2T types, 35 passenger cars and 172 freight cars.
