= Children's railway =

Railway operated by children with adult supervision for educational purposes

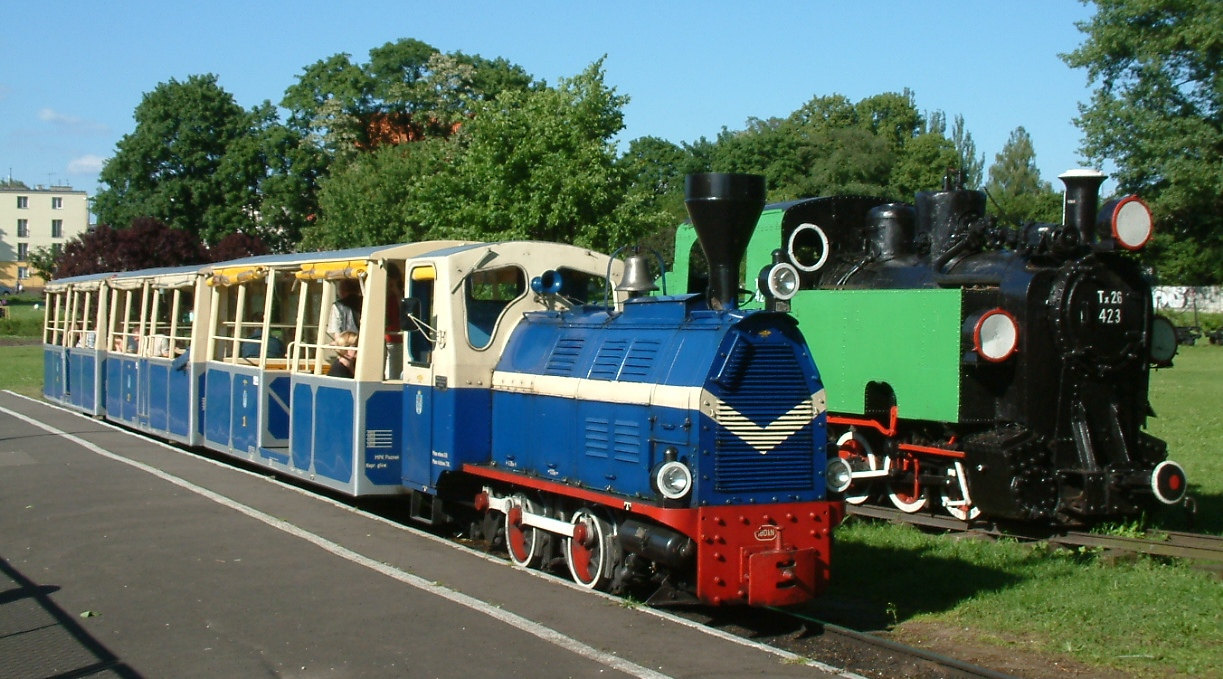
Kolejka Parkowa Maltanka (Park Railway Maltanka) in Poznań, Poland (600 mm (1 ft 11 5/8 in) gauge).

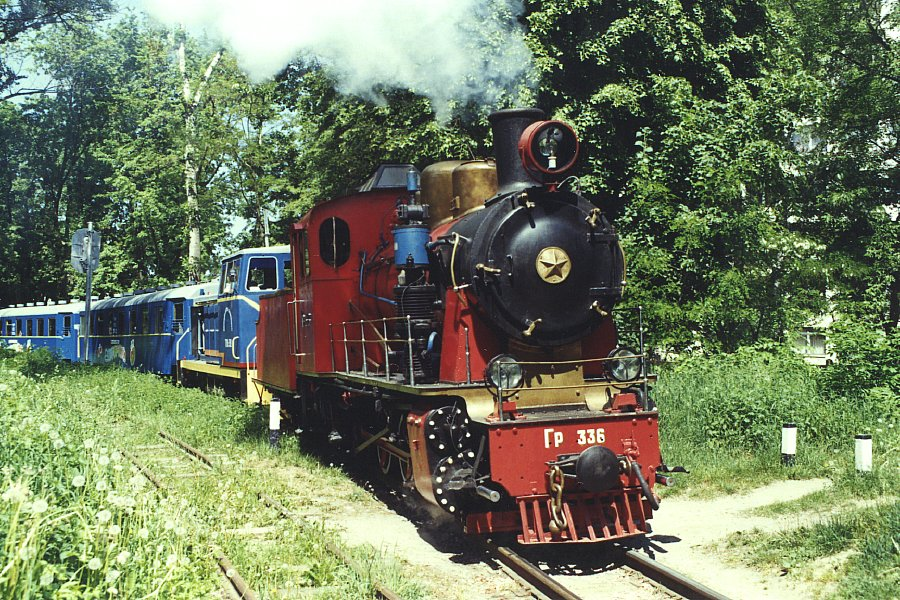
Steam locomotive on Kyiv Children's Railway, Ukraine, 750 mm (2 ft 5 1/2 in) gauge.

A children's railway or pioneer railway is an extracurricular educational institution, where children interested in rail transport can learn railway professions. This phenomenon originated in the USSR and was greatly developed in Soviet times. The world's first children's railway was opened in Gorky Park, Moscow, in 1932. At the breakup of the USSR, 52 children's railways existed in the country.

Many children's railways are still functioning in post-Soviet states and Eastern European countries. Many feature railway technology not seen anymore on the main lines and can be considered heritage railways. Though few exceptions exist, most children's railways built in the Eastern Bloc have a track gauge of at least 600 mm (1 ft 11 5/8 in) and can carry full size narrow gauge rolling stock.

== List of children's railways ==
=== Armenia ===
- Yerevan Children's Railway

=== Azerbaijan ===
- Baku Children's Railway (not operating)

=== Belarus ===
- Children's Railroad (Minsk)

=== Bulgaria ===
- Plovdiv
- Kardzhali

=== China ===
- Harbin

=== Cuba ===
- Camagüey, Parque Camilo Cienfuegos
- Havana, Parque Lenin (not operating)
- Havana, Havana Zoo

=== Georgia ===
- Tbilisi
- Rustavi (not operating)

=== Germany ===
- Parkeisenbahn Wuhlheide, Berlin, Wuhlheide
- Parkeisenbahn Bernburg, Bernburg, Krumbholzallee
- Parkeisenbahn Chemnitz, Chemnitz, Küchwald – Park
- Cottbuser Parkeisenbahn, Cottbus, Eliaspark – Spreeauenpark
- Ferienlandeisenbahn Crispendorf, Crispendorf, Ferienland
- Dresdner Parkeisenbahn, Dresden, Großer Garten
- Parkeisenbahn Gera, Gera, Tierpark
- Görlitzer Parkeisenbahn, Görlitz, An der Landskronbrauerei
- Parkeisenbahn Peißnitzexpress Halle, Halle, Saxony-Anhalt, Peißnitzinsel
- Leipziger Parkeisenbahn, Leipzig-Wahren, Auensee
- Pioniereisenbahn Magdeburg Magdeburg, Rotehornpark, until 1967
- Parkeisenbahn Plauen, Plauen, Syratal
- Parkeisenbahn Vatterode, Vatterode, Vatteröder Teich

=== Hungary ===
- Budapest Children's Railway
- Mecseki narrow gauge railway, Pécs
- Széchenyi Railway Museum, Nagycenk
- Tiszakécske Children's Railway

=== Kazakhstan ===
- Alma-Ata Children's Railway, Almaty
- Karaganda Children's Railway, Karaganda
- Shymkent Children's Railway, Shymkent

closed railways:

- Aktobe
- Arkalyk
- Atbasar
- Ekibastuz
- Kokshetau Children's Railway
- Kostanay
- Astana
- Pavlodar
- Semey
- Schuchinsk
- Zhezkazgan

=== Latvia ===
- Riga Children's Railway (not operating)

=== Poland ===
- Silesian Culture and Recreation Park, Chorzów
- Park Railway Maltanka, Poznań (now run by the city)

=== Russia ===
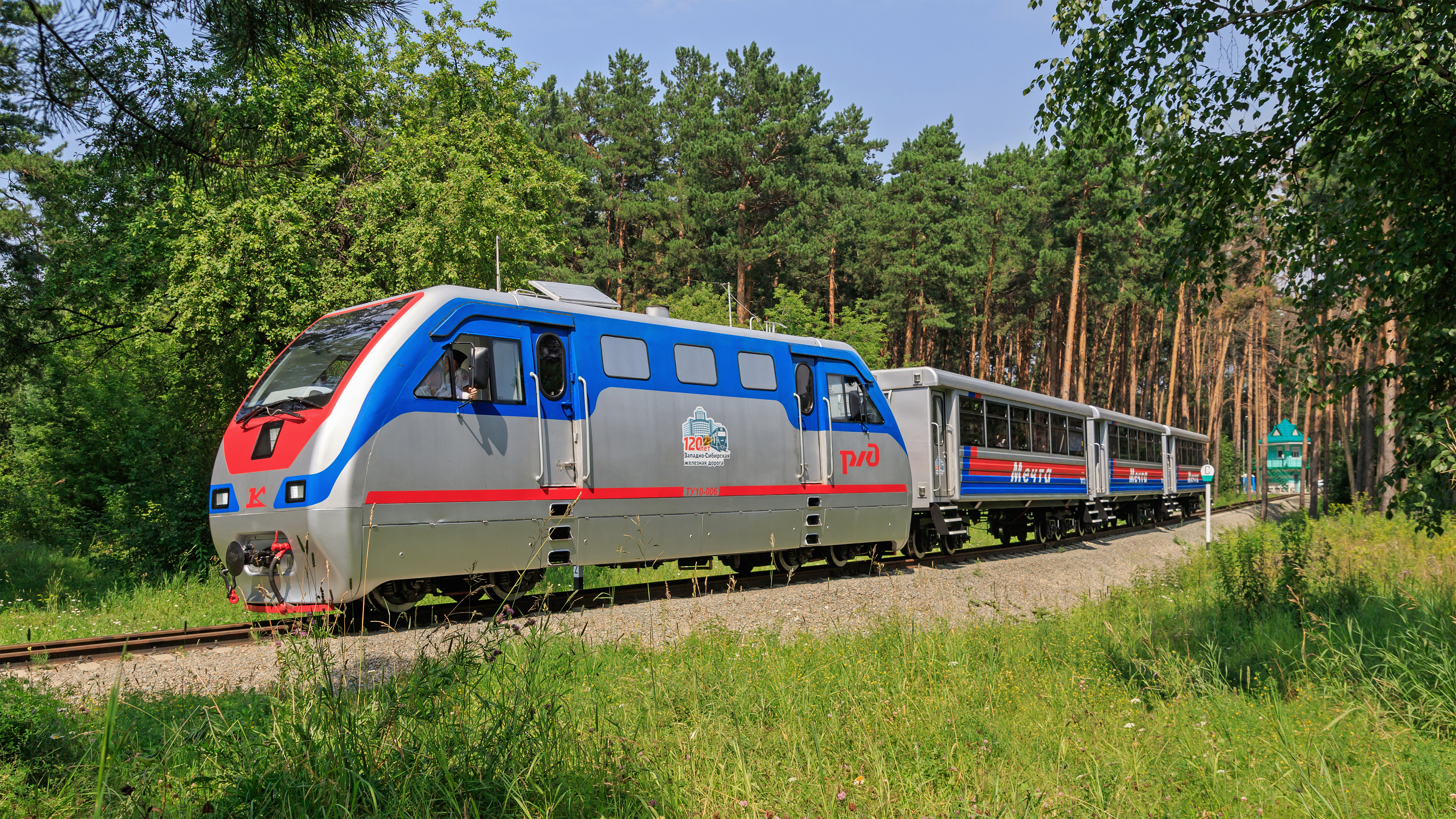
Train of Novosibirsk Children's Railway

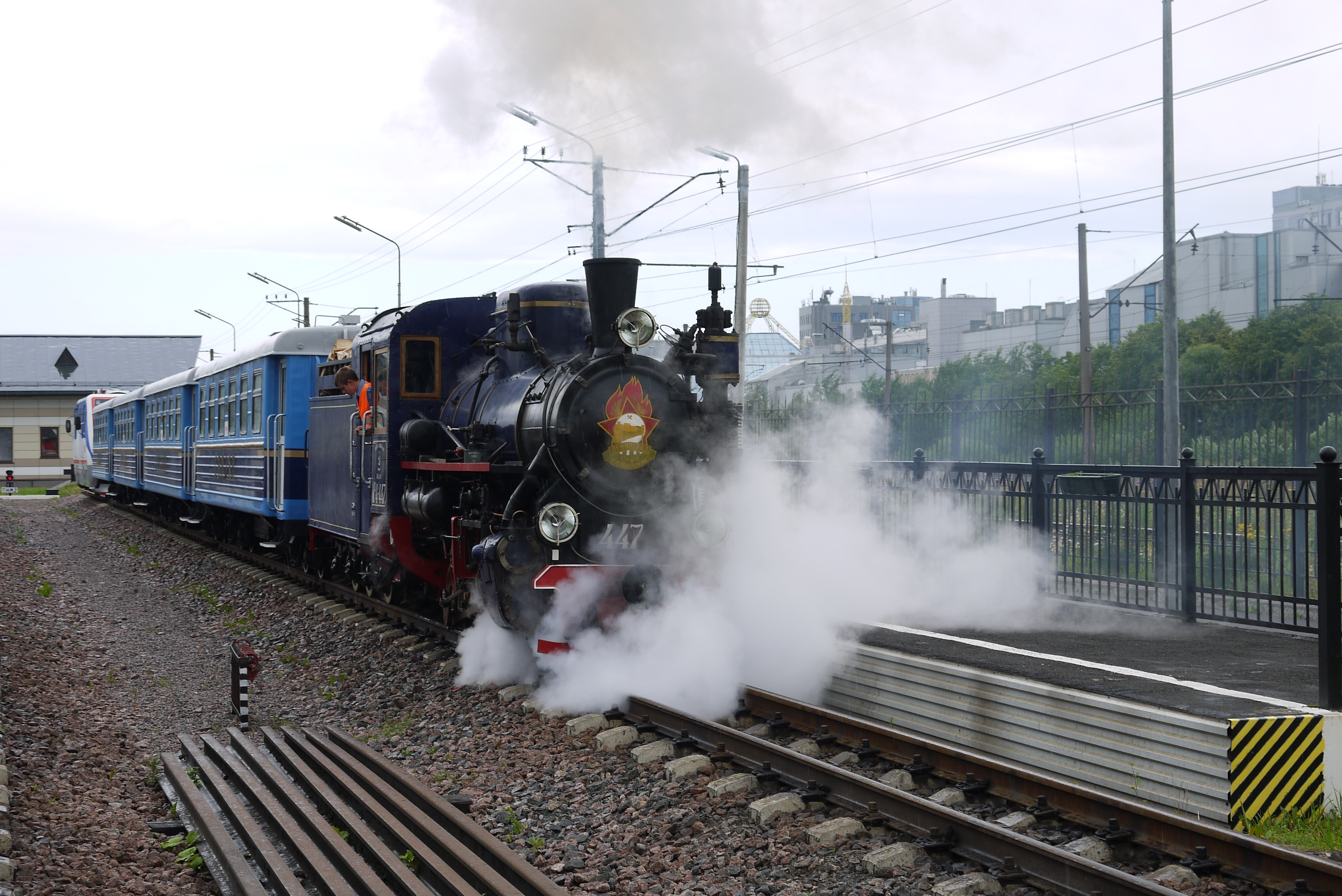
Kp4-447 Southern St.Peterburg Children's Railway with tender from Kch4-332. Taken at Molodejnaya Station at the North end of the line

- Chelyabinsk
- Chita
- Ekaterinburg
- Irkutsk
- Kazan
- Kemerovo
- Far East Children's Railway, Khabarovsk
- Krasnoyarsk
- Kratovo
- Kurgan
- Liski
- Nizhny Novgorod
- Novomoskovsk
- Small West Siberian Railway, Novosibirsk
- Orenburg
- Penza
- Rostov-Na-Donu
- Sankt-Petersburg, Malaya Oktyabrskaya railway
- Svobodny
- Tyumen
- Ufa
- Vladikavkaz
- Volgograd
- Children's Railway Sakhalin, Yuzhno-Sakhalinsk
- Yaroslavl

=== Slovakia ===
- Košice Children's Heritage Railway, Košice

=== Slovenia ===
- Ljubljana

=== Turkey ===
- Gençlik Parkı (not operating)
- Ali Çetinkaya railway station (not operating)
- Kültürpark (not operating)

=== Turkmenistan ===
- Ashgabat

=== Ukraine ===
- Dnipro
- Donetsk
- Kharkiv
- Kyiv
- Lutsk
- Lviv
- Rivne
- Uzhorod
- Zaporizhzhia

=== United Kingdom ===
- Downs Light Railway

=== Uzbekistan ===
- Jizzakh
- Tashkent

== See also ==
- Backyard railroad
- Garden railway
- Minimum-gauge railway
- Ridable miniature railway
- Train ride
