= Kokshetau Children's Railway =

Kokshetau Children's Railway Kökşetau balalar temır joly (Kazakh) Кокшетауская детская железная дорога (Russian)

History
- Opened: 6 August 1978
- Closed: 1996

Technical
- Line length: Total: 1.8 km (1.1 mi)
- Track gauge: 750 mm (2 ft 5 1/2 in)

The Kokshetau Children's Railway (Kazakh: Көкшетау балалар темір жолы, romanized: Kökşetau balalar temır joly; Russian: Кокшета́уская де́тская желе́зная доро́га) was a narrow gauge children's railway in Kokshetau in Kazakhstan. The track with a gauge of 750 mm (2 ft 5 1/2 in) had a length of 1.8 kilometres (1.1 mi). It had one railway station. The railway was inaugrarated on 6 August 1978 as one of the many pioneer railways in the Soviet Union. It was taken out of service and dismantled in 1996.

== Route ==
So far the track had a length of 1.8 km (1.1 miles). It had one station.

== Overview ==
It was fully operated by teenagers. One of many children's railways that existed in the USSR and continued functioning after its breakup in post-Soviet states, it was opened on 6 August 1978 and continued functioning until 1996. The railway line counted 1 station: Sinegorie (or Sinegorye).

== Rolling stock ==
=== Carriages ===
The trains had the names such as Yunyy Kokchetavets (Юный Кокчетавец, Young Kokshetau resident) and so on.

== See also ==
- Children's railway
- Rail transport in Kazakhstan
- Kazakhstan Railways
- Kokshetau railway station
