= Sergo =

Sergo may refer to:

Surname

- Ulderico Sergo (1913–1967), bantamweight professional boxer from Italy, who won the gold medal at the 1936 Summer Olympics in Berlin

Given name

- Sergo Chakhoyan (born 1969), Armenian weightlifter who represented Australia later in his career
- Sergo Goglidze (1901–1953), Georgian NKVD officer
- Sergo Kldiashvili (1893–1986), Georgian prose-writer
- Sergo Kobuladze (1909–1978), Georgian painter and illustrator
- Sergo Ordzhonikidze (1886–1937), leading Soviet (Georgian) politician
- Sergo Mikoyan (1929–2010), one of the Soviet Union's leading historians
- Sergo Zakariadze (1909–1971), Georgian actor
