= TU2 diesel locomotive =

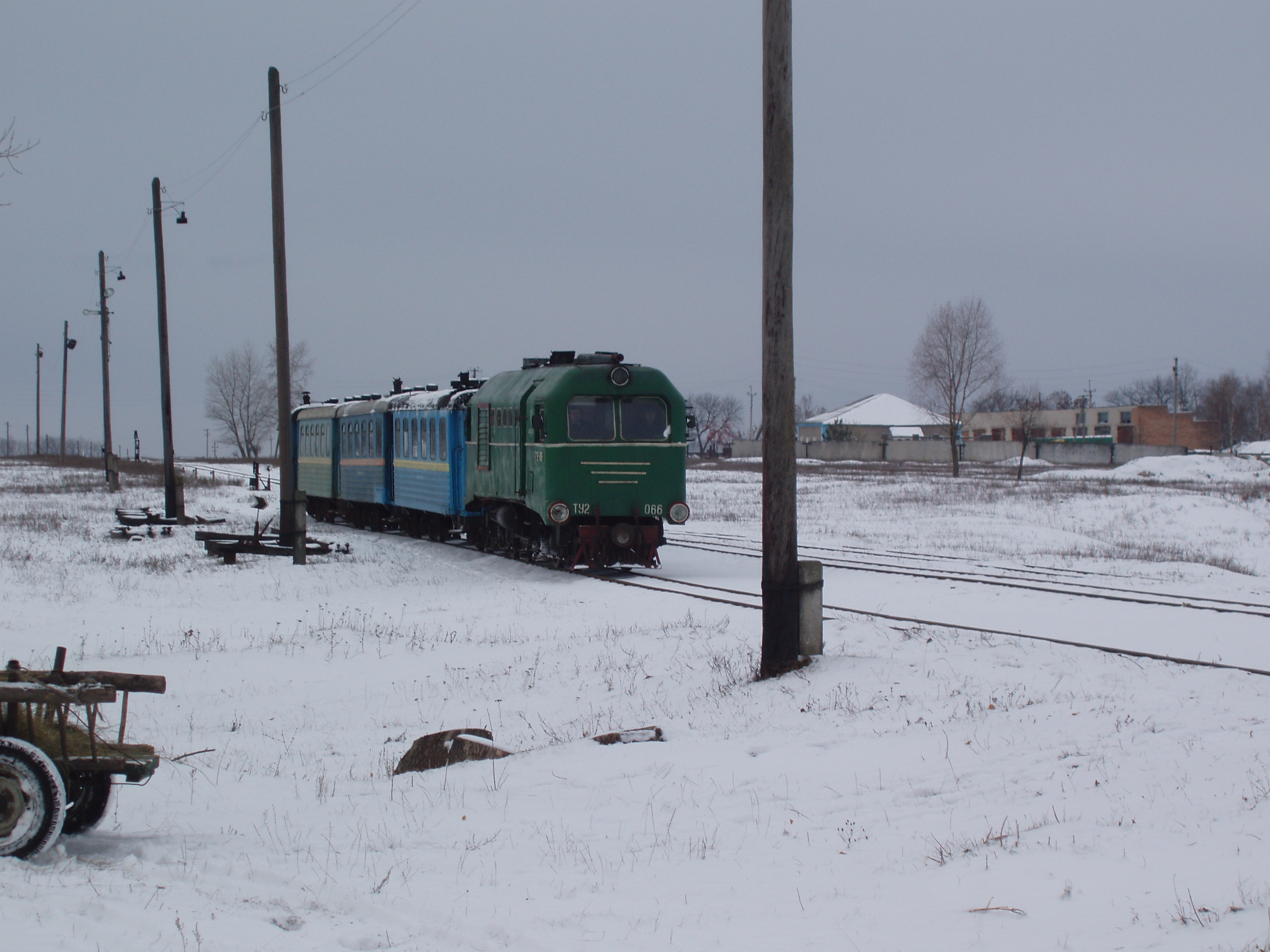
TU2 pulls passenger train, narrow gauge railway in Rivne oblast, Ukraine, 2006

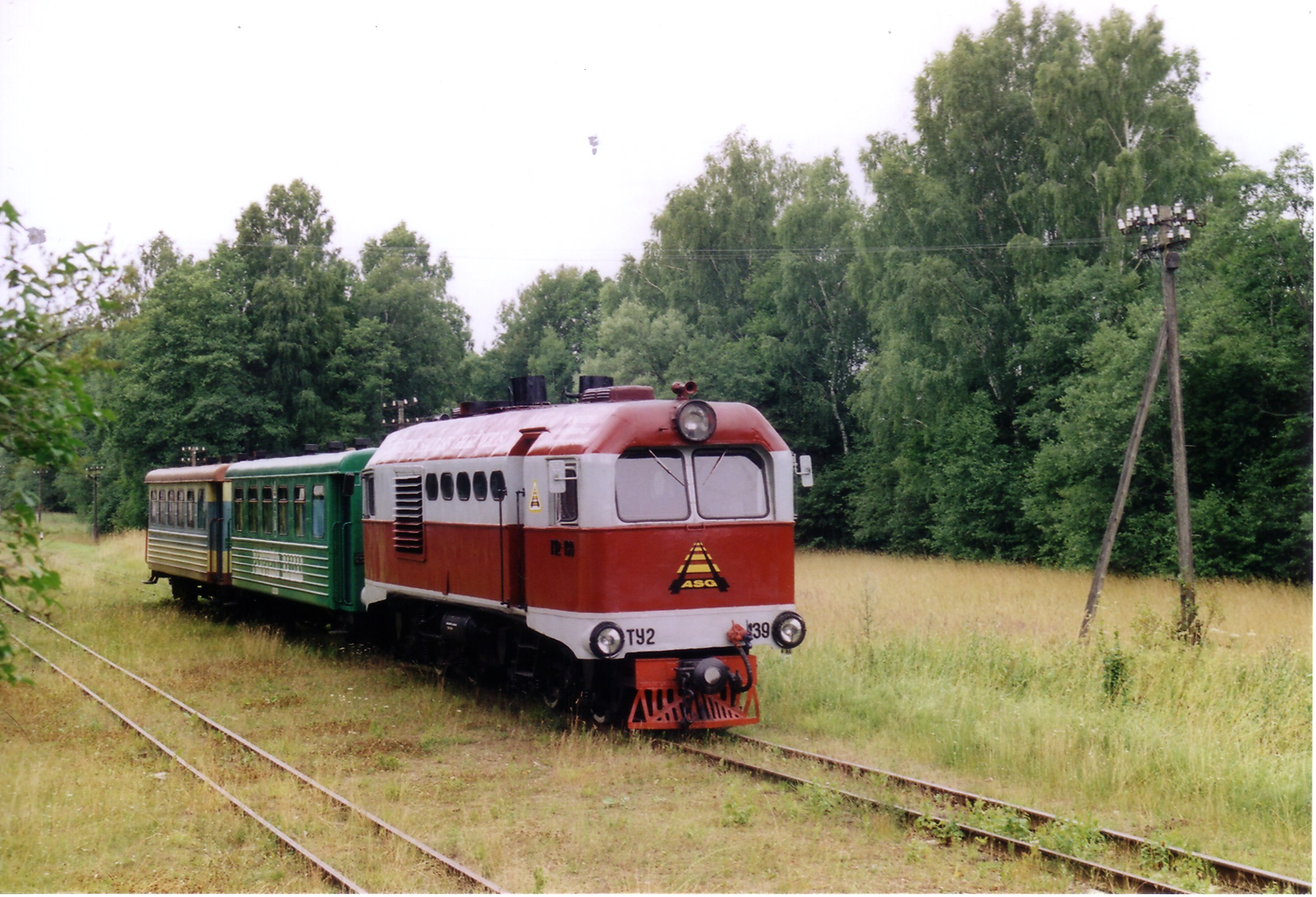
TU2 in Lithuania, 2005

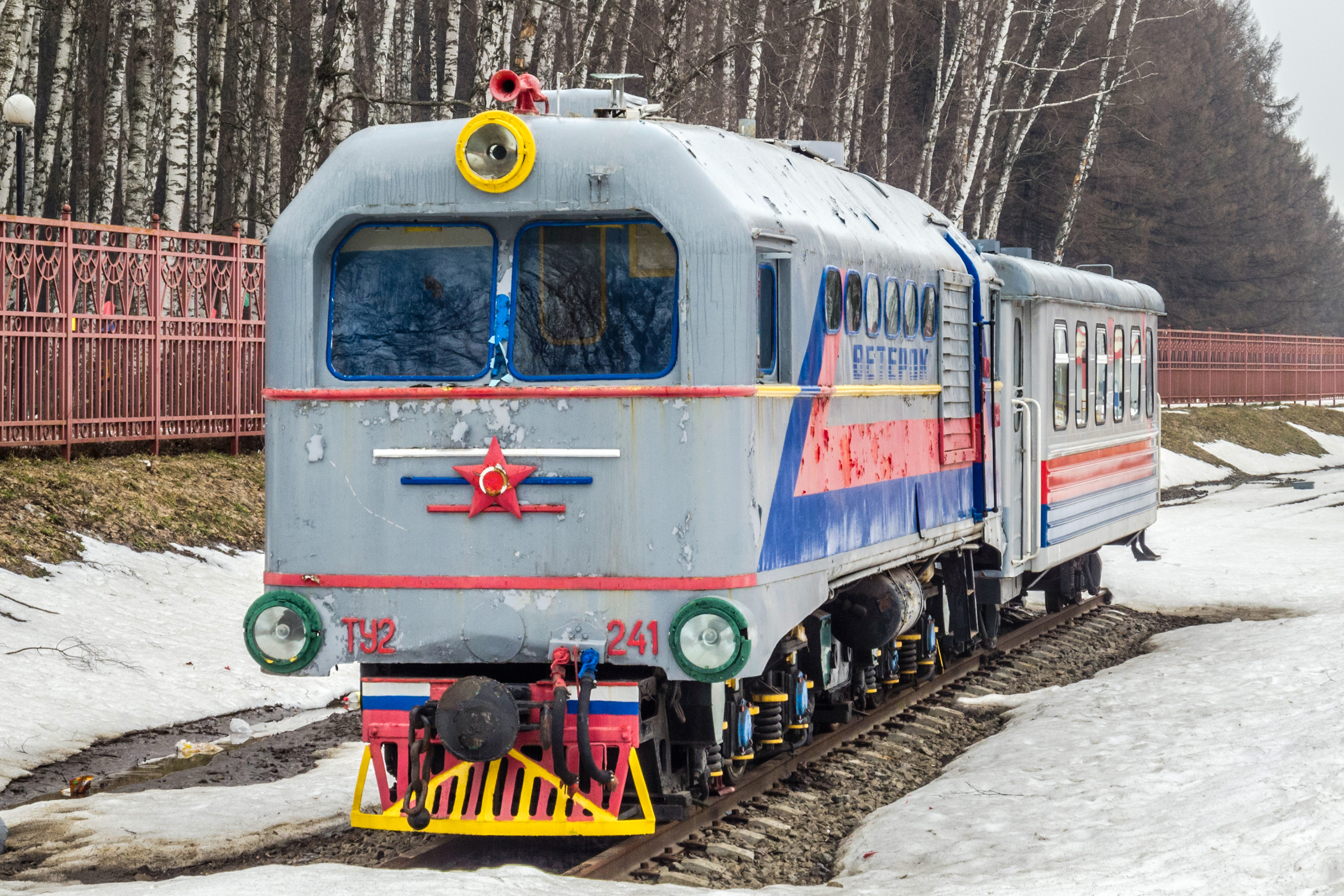
TU2-241 at the children's railway in Novomoskovsk, Russia

TU2 (ТУ2) is a Soviet narrow gauge diesel locomotive for the track gauge of 750 mm (2 ft 5 1/2 in)

== History ==
The decision to replace steam locomotives by diesel ones on the narrow gauge railways was taken after the Second World War. The first diesel locomotive built for the 750 mm (2 ft 5 1/2 in) narrow gauge railways was the TU1, built in 1954; only two locomotives of this type were built.

The TU2 was an improved redesign of the TU1. The first TU2 was built in 1955. The first TU2 was tested on the test site of the Central Scientific Institute (in Shatura), that belonged to the Ministry of the Ways and Communications. The tests were successful, so the TU2 was taken into production.

The only factory that produced the TU2 was Kaluga machine factory. The first three locomotives were tested again, in Panevėžys (Lithuania) and Pärnu (Estonia). During the tests, the locomotive could reach speeds of 76 km/h (47 mph), but due to the poor tracks on most of the country's narrow gauge railways, the highest speed during normal operation was 50 km/h (31 mph).

TU2 diesel locomotives were produced till 1959; 281 locomotives were built.

The locomotives were used on many narrow gauge railways to haul cargo as well as passenger trains. Later they were replaced by more modern designs. As of 2007, they are no longer in use on the narrow gauge railways in Russia, but some narrow gauge railways in Ukraine still use them. Many children's railways use TU2 locomotives too. The Aukštaitijos narrow gauge railway in Lithuania also still operates the TU2.

== Design ==
TU2 is a diesel-electric locomotive. The main diesel engine is 1D12 and it produces 300 hp. The main engine drives the electric generator (195 kW) that supplies electricity to four traction motors, 62 kW each.

== See also ==
- The Museum of the Moscow Railway, at Paveletsky Rail Terminal, Moscow
- Rizhsky Rail Terminal, Home of the Moscow Railway Museum
- Varshavsky Rail Terminal, St.Petersburg, Home of the Central Museum of Railway Transport, Russian Federation
- History of rail transport in Russia
