= Narrow-gauge railways in Spain =

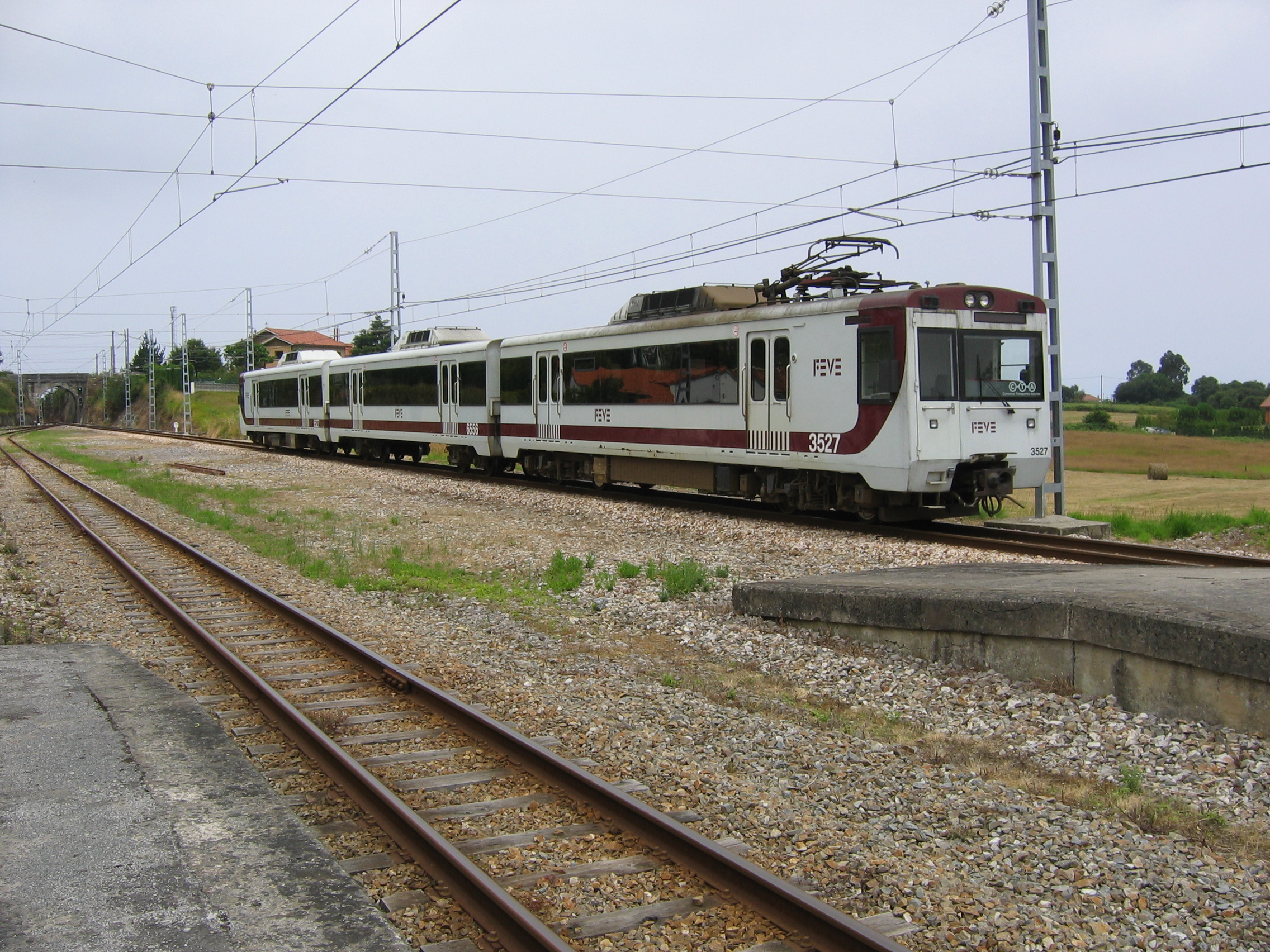
Electric unit 3500, operated by FEVE, arriving at Muros de Nalón station, on its way to Gijón

In Spain there is an extensive 1,984 km (1,233 mi) system of 1,000 mm (3 ft 3 3/8 in) metre gauge railways. The majority of these railways were historically operated by FEVE, (Ferrocarriles de Vía Estrecha, narrow-gauge railways). Created in 1965, FEVE started absorbing numerous privately owned narrow-gauge railways. From 1978 onwards, with the introduction of regionalisation devolution under the new Spanish constitution, FEVE began transferring responsibility for a number of its operations to the new regional governments, and was dissolved on 31 December 2012, handing the remaining narrow-gauge services to the other national operator Renfe.

In 2023 transport officials in RENFE in Spain resigned when it was found that narrow-gauge passenger rolling-stock ordered in 2020 for the northern regions of Asturias and Cantabria would be too wide for the tunnels and were to be redesigned with delays of a year or two in delivery. This error stemmed from the loss of knowledge from the dissolution of FEVE, since Renfe did not integrate FEVE into its structure, rather keeping it as a separate subdivision called Renfe Feve. Following the oversized trains scandal, most Renfe Feve services were integrated into Renfe, with some left as of 2025.

== Northern Spain ==
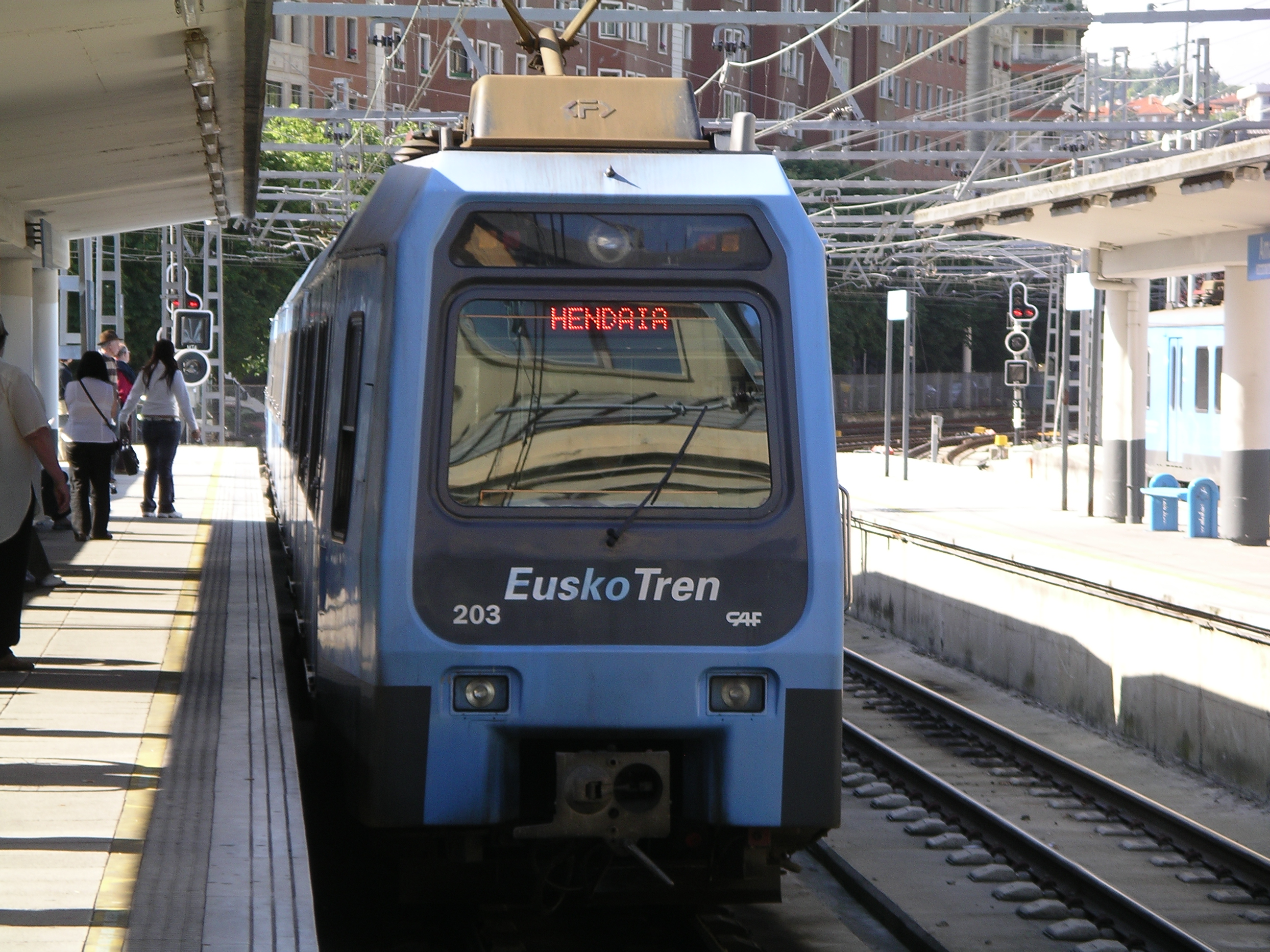
Euskotren Trena unit at Amara station, Donostia–San Sebastián

In the north of the country, operated by Renfe and EuskoTren (Eusko Trenbideak, Basque Railways), is the longest narrow-gauge network in Europe. Its mainline is a metre-gauge line which runs for 650 km (404 mi) along the entire length of Spain's north coast, from Ferrol to Hendaye, and another one in the northern mountains from Aranguren to León.

Renfe operates the railway except from the Bilbao–Hendaye side. They offer regional trains between the capitals, as well as commuter rail services around them, and a tram-train in León.

EuskoTren is the Basque regional government rail company, which operates the line from Bilbao to Hendaye and metric-gauge trams and metro, started in 1995.

== Andalusia ==
- FC Granada a Sierra Nevada; 750 mm (2 ft 5 1/2 in) gauge, 21.7 km (13.5 mi), 1925-1974

== Castile–La Mancha ==
- FC Valdepenas a Puertollano; 750 mm (2 ft 5 1/2 in) gauge, 78 km (48 mi), 1924-1963

== Catalonia ==
Barcelona

- FGC (Catalan regional government railways), Metro del Baix Llobregat, Llobregat–Anoia line
- Funicular de Vallvidrera
- Funicular del Tibidabo

Gelida

- Funicular de Gelida

Girona

- FC de Flassa a Palamos, Gerona y Banolas; 750 mm (2 ft 5 1/2 in) gauge, 63 km (39 mi), 1892-1969
- FC de San Feliu de Guixois a Gerona; 750 mm (2 ft 5 1/2 in) gauge, 42 km (26 mi), 1887-1956

Montserrat

- Funicular de Sant Joan
- Funicular de la Santa Cova at Montserrat
- Cremallera de Montserrat, a rack railway.

Northern Catalonia

- Cremallera de Núria, a rack railway.
- Ferrocarril Turístic de l'Alt Llobregat, a 600 mm (1 ft 11 5/8 in) gauge tourist line.

== Valencian community ==
- FGV (Valencian regional government railways) around the city of Valencia, as well as along the Costa Blanca from Alicante to Dénia

Castellón

- FC de Onda al Grao de Castellon y Villareal-Puerto de Burriana; 750 mm (2 ft 5 1/2 in) gauge, 43 km (27 mi), 1888–1963

== Madrid ==
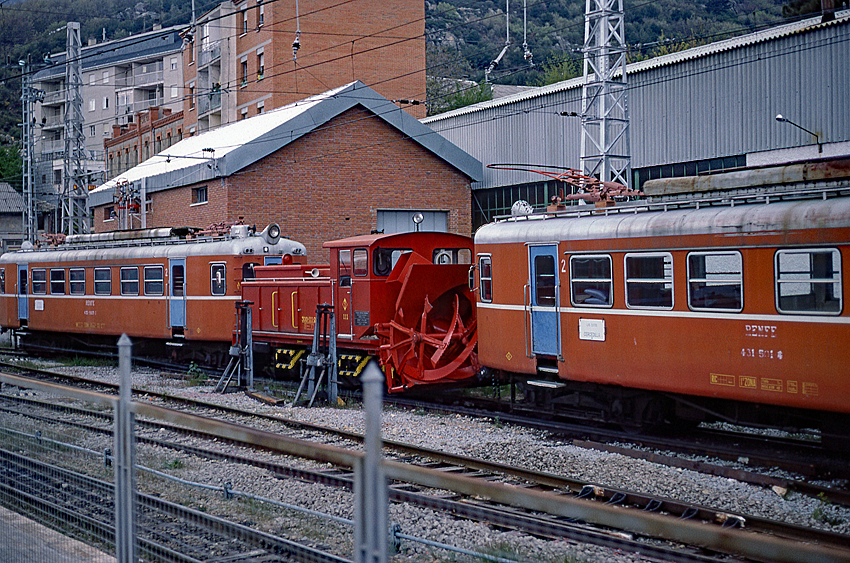
FC del Guadarrama stock at Cercedilla

- Ferrocaril Électrico del Guadarrama near Madrid, in the Sierra del Guadarrama, runs a metre-gauge electric line through a short but extremely sinuous track from Cercedilla to Los Cotos.

== Majorca ==
- SFM (Serveis Ferroviaris de Mallorca); 1,000 mm (3 ft 3 3/8 in)
- FS (Ferrocarril de Sóller) operates a 3 ft (914 mm) gauge electrified railway and connecting tramway, the Tranvía de Sóller.
- Palma Metro; 1,000 mm (3 ft 3 3/8 in)

== Murcia ==
- Renfe operates the 19.6 km (12.2 mi) Cartagena–Los Nietos line; 1,000 mm (3 ft 3 3/8 in) gauge

== See also ==
- History of rail transport in Spain
- Rail transport in Spain
