= Aeri de Montserrat =

Coordinates: 41°35′27″N 1°51′11″E

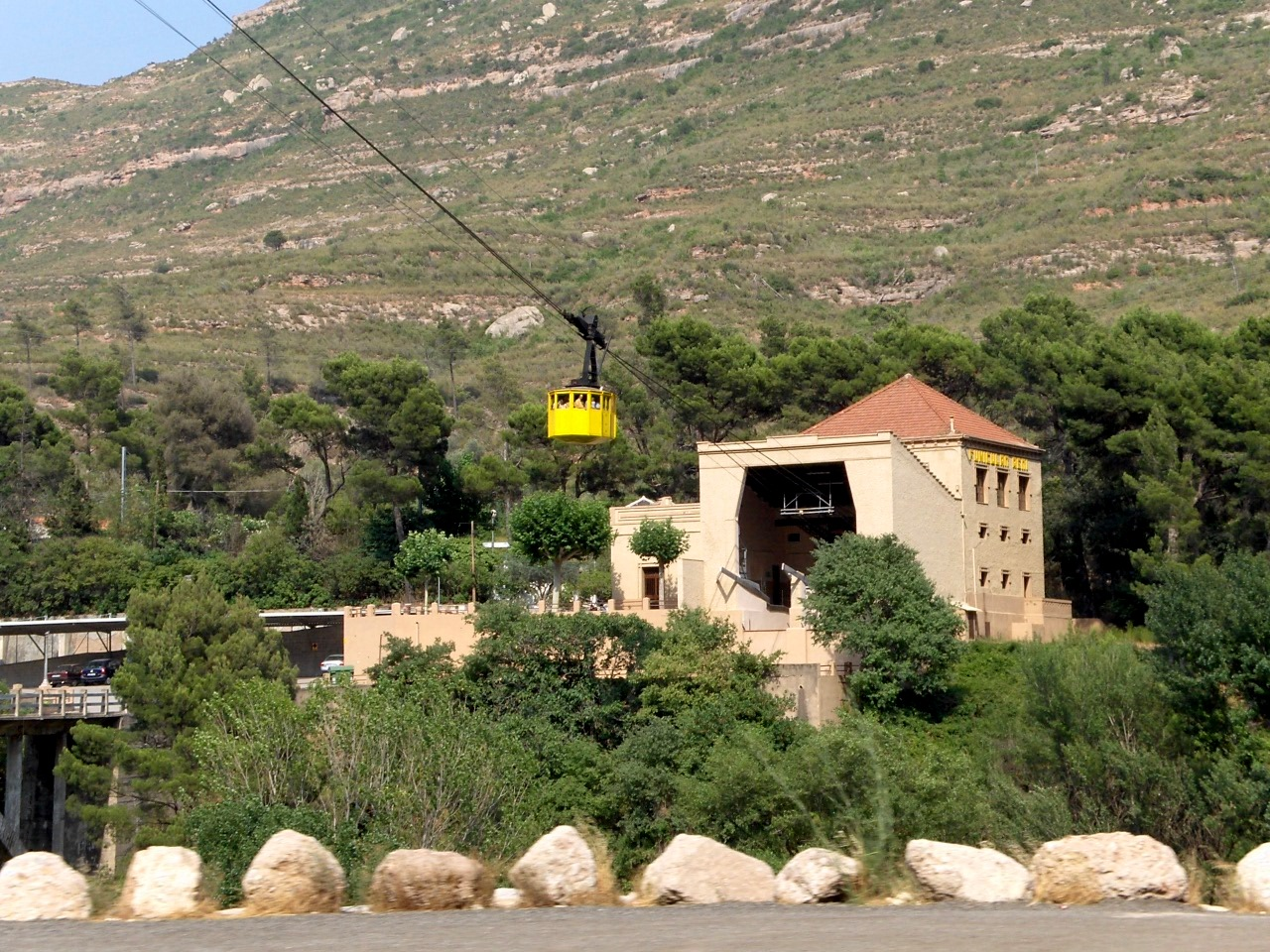
Aeri de Montserrat cable car

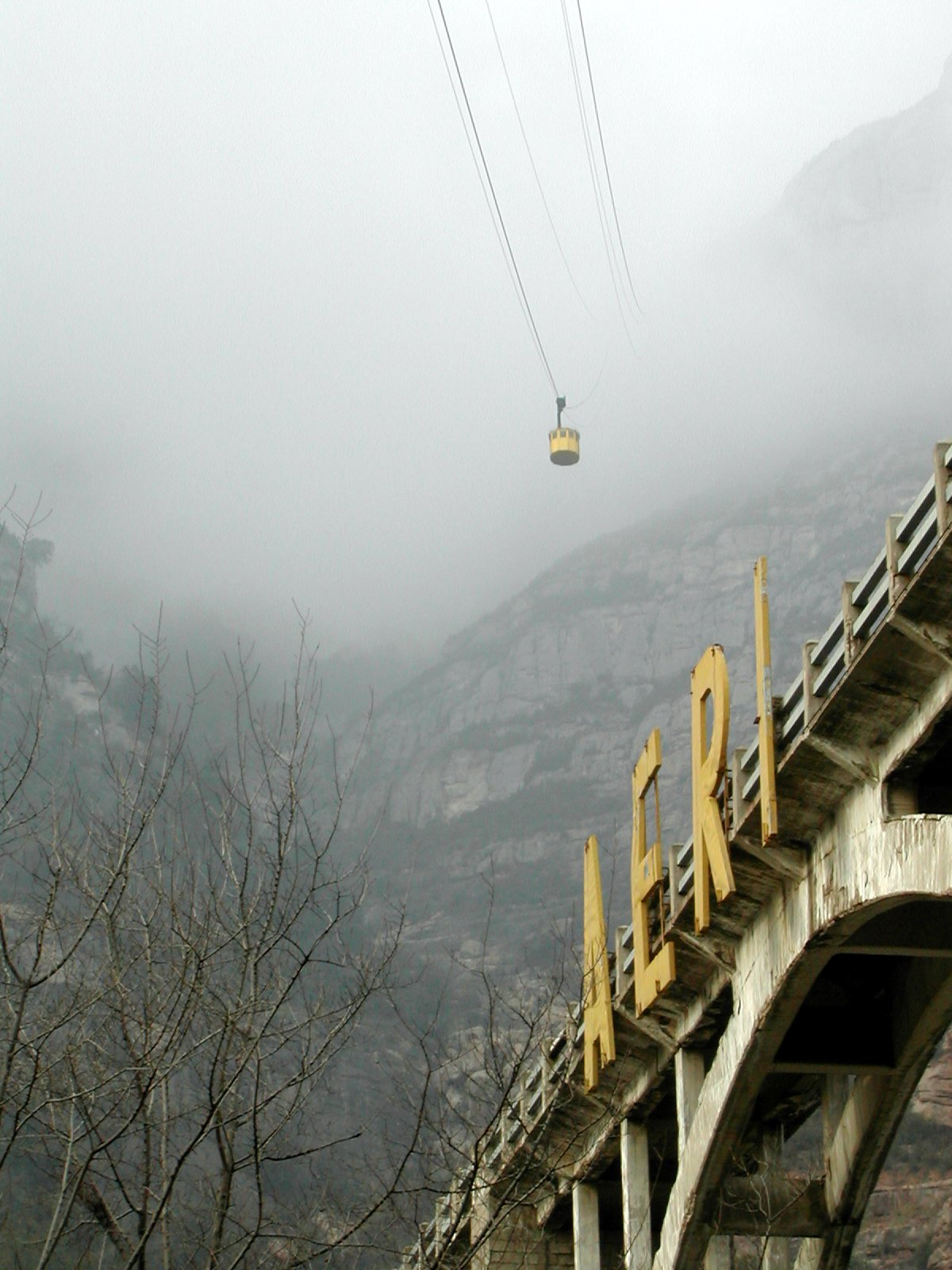
Aeri de Montserrat

The Aeri de Montserrat (Catalan pronunciation: [əˈɛɾi ðə munsəˈrat]) is an aerial cable car which provides one of the means of access to the Montserrat mountain and abbey. It can be found 1 hour from the city of Barcelona, Catalonia, Spain.

The cable car is operated by a separate company than the rack railroad and funiculars, and is not coordinated with them.

The line runs from the monastery to the station of Montserrat-Aeri, on the Ferrocarrils de la Generalitat de Catalunya (FGC) line from Barcelona-Plaça d'Espanya station to Manresa. The FGC operates the Montserrat Rack Railway, which provides an alternative access to the mountain and abbey, and two funicular railways on the mountain, the Funicular de Sant Joan and the Funicular de Santa Cova.

The cable car was engineered by Adolf Bleichert & Co. who had previously designed the Predigtstuhl Cable Car in Bad Reichenhall, Germany.

== See also ==
- Port Vell Aerial Tramway, aerial tramway in Barcelona
- Montjuïc Aerial Tramway, aerial tramway in Barcelona
- Telefèric d'Olesa a Esparreguera, aerial tramway near Barcelona
