= Ángel Villalba =

Spanish politician

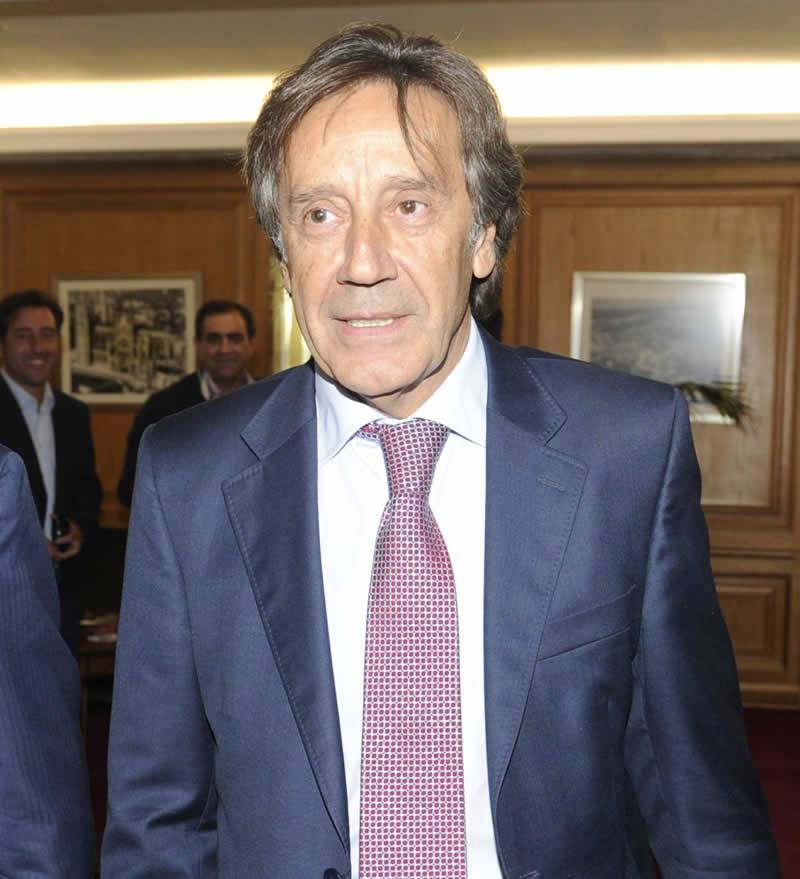
Villalba in 2020

Ángel Roberto Villalba Álvarez (born 15 April 1949) is a Spanish former politician of the Spanish Socialist Workers' Party (PSOE). He was a city councillor in León (1987–1993) and a member of the Senate of Spain (2001–2003). He was secretary general of the PSOE in Castile and León (2000–2008) and a member of the Cortes of Castile and León from 2003 to 2008. He was also president of the board at Caja España from 1993 to 1997, and of Ferrocarriles Españoles de Vía Estrecha (FEVE) from 2008 to 2012.

== Biography ==
Born in León, Villalba graduated in Hispanic studies from the University of Oviedo. He then taught at secondary schools in the Province of León, where he later became a schools inspector.

Villalba was a city councillor in León from 1987 to 1993. He was then president of the board at the Caja España building society, and faced calls to resign by the People's Party (PP) over the financial performance, eventually leaving in 1997.

In October 2000, Villalba was elected secretary general of the Socialist Party of Castile and León. As he did not have a seat in the Cortes of Castile and León and there was no election scheduled until 2003, he was named to the Senate of Spain instead, at the expense of Octavio Granado who had held the seat since 1983. The nomination was controversial, with other parties and one member of his own party abstaining.

In the 2003 regional election, the PSOE led by Villalba gained one seat, but the PP led by Juan Vicente Herrera won a majority. In the concurrent local elections, the party made gains in Castile and León, despite losing control of Burgos and failing in the aim of taking the mayor's office in Valladolid. Villalba was re-elected as secretary-general in 2004, with an increased majority of 88.77% of the vote.

By the time of the 2007 Castilian-Leonese regional election, the PSOE were popular due to the national government of prime minister José Luis Rodríguez Zapatero, but Villalba could only win one more seat than in 2003, while the PP retained their exact number of seats in an absolute majority. The results were again more favourable in the local elections in Castile and León, in which the PSOE took four of the provincial capitals.

In June 2008, Villalba left his political offices and was named president of the board at Ferrocarriles Españoles de Vía Estrecha (FEVE), the state-owned narrow-gauge railways. He was replaced in January 2012 due to a new government after the general election.
