= Monestir de Montserrat =

Singular population entity in Spain

- Singular population entity
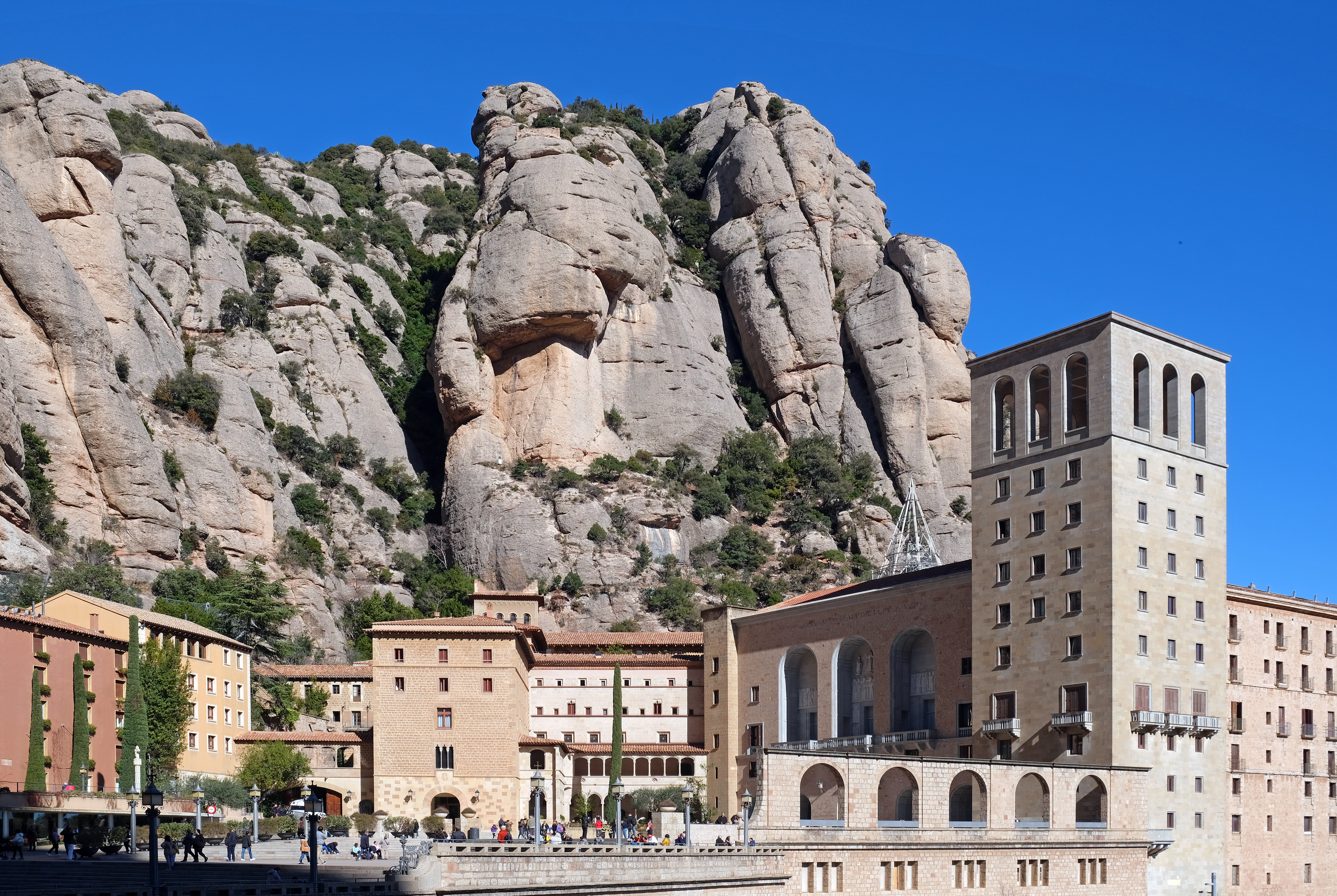
- View of Monestir de Montserrat

- Location within Spain Location within Catalonia Location within Province of Barcelona
- Coordinates: 41°35′36.0″N 1°50′15.2″E
- Country: Spain
- A. community: Catalunya
- Province: Barcelona
- Municipality: Monistrol de Montserrat

Population (January 1, 2024)
  - Total: 41
- Time zone: UTC+01:00
- Postal code: 08199
- MCN: 08127000400

Monestir de Montserrat is a singular population entity in the municipality of Monistrol de Montserrat, in Catalonia, Spain.

As of 2024 it has a population of 41 people.
