= Sant Jeroni (el Bruc) =

Coordinates: 41°36′19″N 1°48′41″E

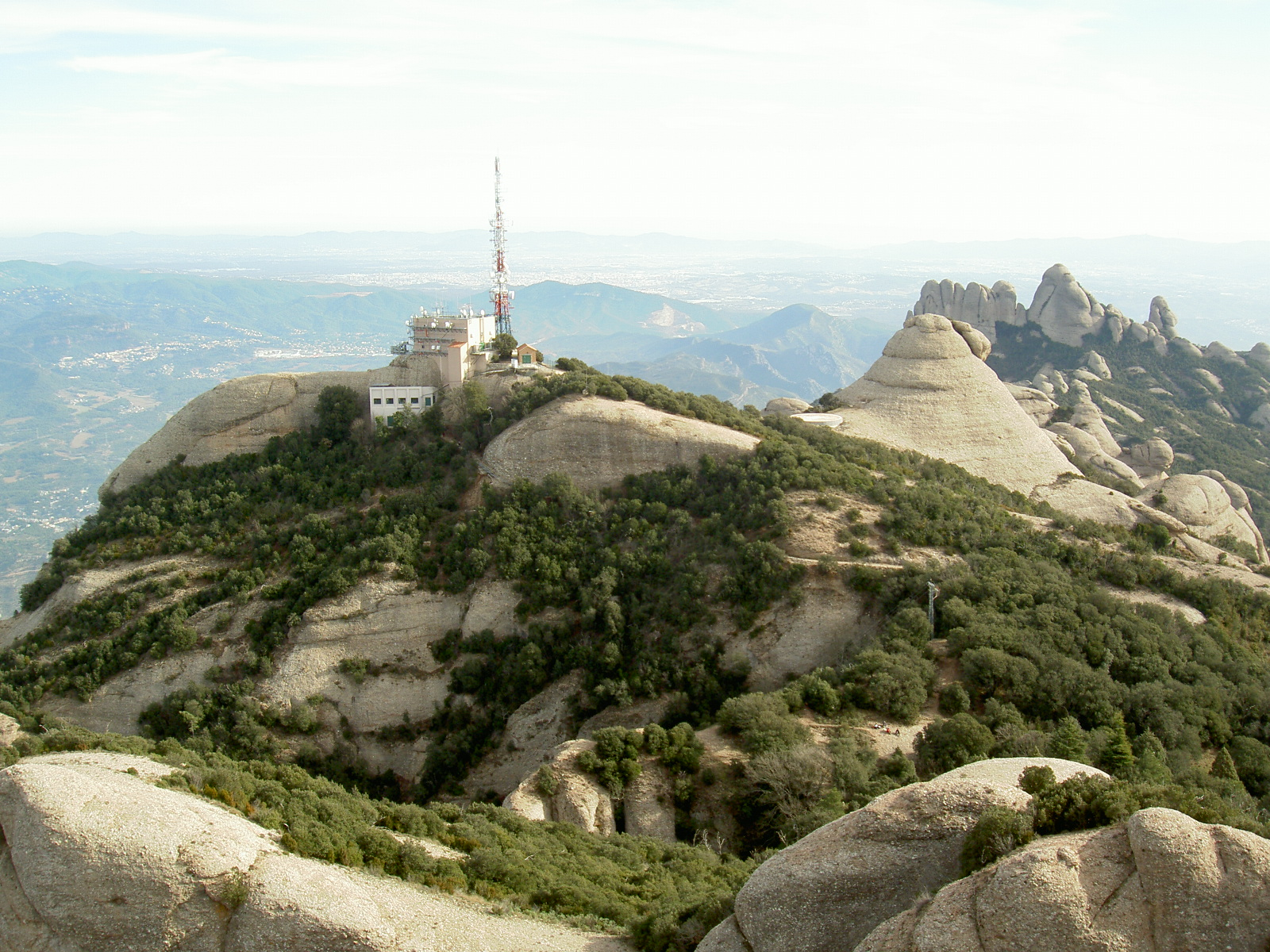

Highest point
- Elevation: 1,236 m (4,055 ft)

Geography
- Location: Catalonia, Spain
- Parent range: Montserrat

Sant Jeroni (el Bruc) is a mountain of Catalonia, Spain. It has an elevation of 1,236 metres above sea level.

== See also ==
- Mountains of Catalonia
