= Oriol Sellarès =

Spanish paralympic athlete (born 1987)

Personal information
- Full name: Oriol Sellarès Martínez
- Nationality: Spanish
- Born: 10 August 1987 (age 38) Monistrol de Montserrat, Barcelona, Spain

Sport
- Country: Spain
- Sport: Track and field

Oriol Sellarès Martínez (born 10 August 1987) is a Spanish track and field competitor on the regional level and a track and field sighted guide on the international level, representing Spain at the 2012 Summer Paralympics as the guide for Ricardo de Pedraza Losa.

== Background ==
Sellarès was born on 10 August 1987 in Monistrol de Montserrat, Barcelona and is from the Catalan region of Spain. In 2012, he lived in Monistrol Montserrat, Barcelona. In 2011, he congratulated La Vanguardia on creating a Catalan language version of their site for young people.

== Career ==
=== Athletics ===
Sellarès has been a member of CA Manresa, a Catalonia based athletics club.

At the XXIV Cros de Sant Hilari Sacalm in 2006, Sellarès finished third. In 2006, Sellarès competed at the 40è Cros Internacional de Granollers, earning a second-place finish in one event with a time of 4:38. That year, he was invited to participate in a training camp held by the Catalan Federation of Athletics. In 2007, he was one of two members of his club to compete in the 800 meter event at the Catalan League Final Clubs. In 2007 in Vallès, he competed at the 2ena Milla Urbana de Ripollet where he finished third. In 2007, he competed in the Spanish club cross country championships where he finished 72nd. At the qualifying session for a competition that was part of Catalan League in 2008, he set a time of 2:01.45 in the 800 meters. In another race in the 2008 Catalan League season, he participated in a 4 × 400 meter event. In June 2008, he made the podium in 3000 metres steeplechase at the Catalan junior championships with a time of 10:14.06. He competed at the Lliga Catalana 2008. In 2008, he competed at an international athletics competition held in Palafrugell. In 2009, he competed in the Lliga Catalana de Clubs in the 800 meter event, one of two members of his club to represent them in that event. In May 2009 at a race in Sellarès, he finished fourth in a middle-distance race with a time of 4:03.66. June 2009 saw a Sellarés set a personal best time of 1:56.86 in the 800 meters in a race where he finished sixth. At the November 2009 edition of the Jean Bouin race, he finished 28th overall in the 10 km race. In January 2010, he competed at the Catalan indoor championships in the 800 meters. In February 2010, his team competed at the Catalan cross country club championship, with the top four team qualifying for the national competition. Running for his team and finishing 32nd overall, his team finished sixth and failed to qualify. In April 2010, he was one of two members of his club to compete at a Catalan League event in the men's 800 meters. In April 2011, he participated in a qualifying race for the finals of a Catalan League event in the 800 meters. In April 2011 in Catalonia, there was an eight club meet which he participated in, finishing seventh in the 800 meters. In May 2011, he competed in the men's 1500 meters final as part of a Catalan League event. In December 2012, he won the men's category at a charity race called Race for Life. At the November 2012 edition of the Jean Bouin race, he finished third in the senior men's 10 km race with a time of 34:39. In November 2012, he competed in the Evaristo de la Torre. The Evaristo de la Torre was held again in November 2013 and Sellarès ran in it. Also in November 2013, the Cros Internacional de Sòria was held where he had a fifth-place finish in one event with a time of 35:32 in one event.

=== Guiding ===
Sellarès has been a guide runner for Ricardo de Pedraza Losa, one of three utilized by Pedraza with the other two being Juan Antonio Araujo and Fernando Rey. Pedraza Losa and Sellarès are friends. In December 2010, he was a guide runner at the Spanish national winter athletics championships for the blind. That month, the announcement was made regarding his selection as a guide runner at the 2011 IPC Athletics World Championships in Christchurch, New Zealand. He ran with de Pedraza at the June 2012 IPC European Championships, where the pair won the gold medal in the T11 men's 5000 meter race. Spain's 14 strong visually impaired athletics delegation to the London Games participated in a training camp at the Center for Sports Modernization in La Rioja ahead of the Games. He was one of three members of the Spanish delegation from Bages, Catalonia. As a twenty-five-year-old, he competed at the 2012 Summer Paralympics as a guide. Running with Pedraza, the pair finished in eleventh position in the 5000m T11 race. The 2012 Games were his first. From the Catalan region of Spain, he was a recipient of a 2012 Plan ADOP scholarship.
