= Mont'Serrat, Porto Alegre =

Neighbourhood in Porto Alegre, Rio Grande do Sul, Brazil

Coordinates: 30°01′37″S 51°11′24″W

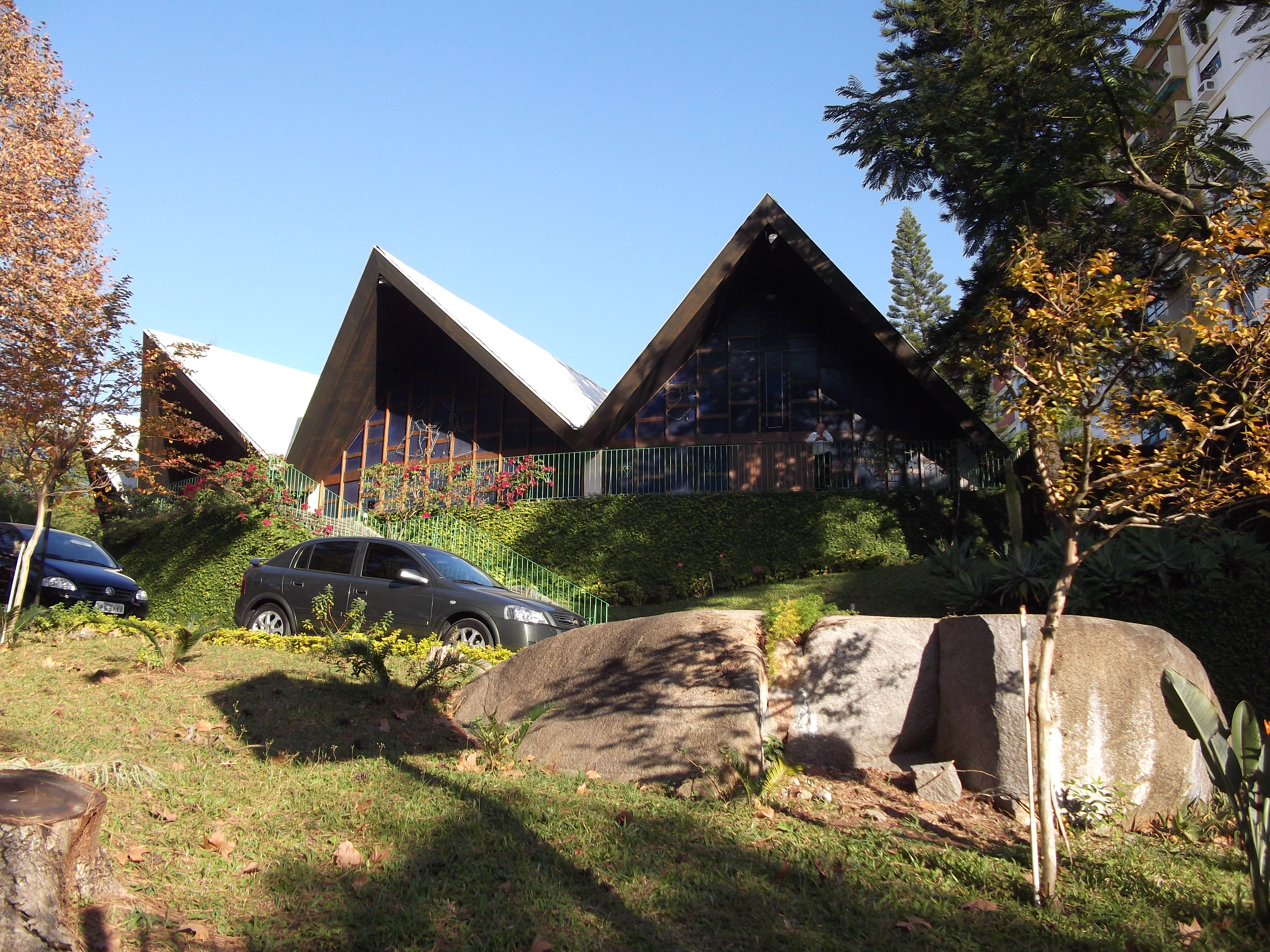
Igreja de Nossa Senhora do Mont'Serrat

Mont'Serrat is a neighbourhood (bairro) in the city of Porto Alegre, the state capital of Rio Grande do Sul, in Brazil. It was created by Law 2022 from December 7, 1959. Located on a hill, Mont'Serrat was named after the famous mountain in Catalonia.

It embraces people from upper middle class to upper class.
