= Can Gomis =

Singular population entity in Spain

- Singular population entity
- Location within Spain Location within Catalonia Location within Province of Barcelona
- Coordinates: 41°35′38.5″N 1°51′08.7″E
- Country: Spain
- A. community: Catalunya
- Province: Barcelona
- Municipality: Monistrol de Montserrat

Population (January 1, 2024)
  - Total: 86
- Time zone: UTC+01:00
- Postal code: 08691
- MCN: 08127000300

Can Gomis is a singular population entity in the municipality of Monistrol de Montserrat, in Catalonia, Spain.

As of 2024 it has a population of 86 people.
