= Els Bacus =

Singular population entity in Spain

els Bacus
- Singular population entity
- Location within Spain Location within Catalonia Location within Province of Barcelona
- Coordinates: 41°37′02.9″N 1°51′18.8″E
- Country: Spain
- A. community: Catalunya
- Province: Barcelona
- Municipality: Monistrol de Montserrat

Population (January 1, 2024)
  - Total: 27
- Time zone: UTC+01:00
- Postal code: 08691
- MCN: 08127000200

els Bacus is a singular population entity in the municipality of Monistrol de Montserrat, in Catalonia, Spain.

As of 2024 it has a population of 27 people.
