= Vilamarics =

- Singular population entity
- Location within Spain Location within Catalonia Location within Province of Barcelona
- Coordinates: 41°39′12.8″N 1°49′04.9″E
- Country: Spain
- A. community: Catalunya
- Province: Barcelona
- Municipality: Monistrol de Montserrat

Population (January 1, 2024)
  - Total: 7
- Time zone: UTC+01:00
- Postal code: 08298
- MCN: 08127000600

Vilamarics is a singular population entity in the municipality of Monistrol de Montserrat, in Catalonia, Spain.

As of 2024 it has a population of 7 people.
