= Montserrat Rack Railway =

Railway line

Coordinates: 41.6093°N 1.83832°E

Cremallera de Montserrat

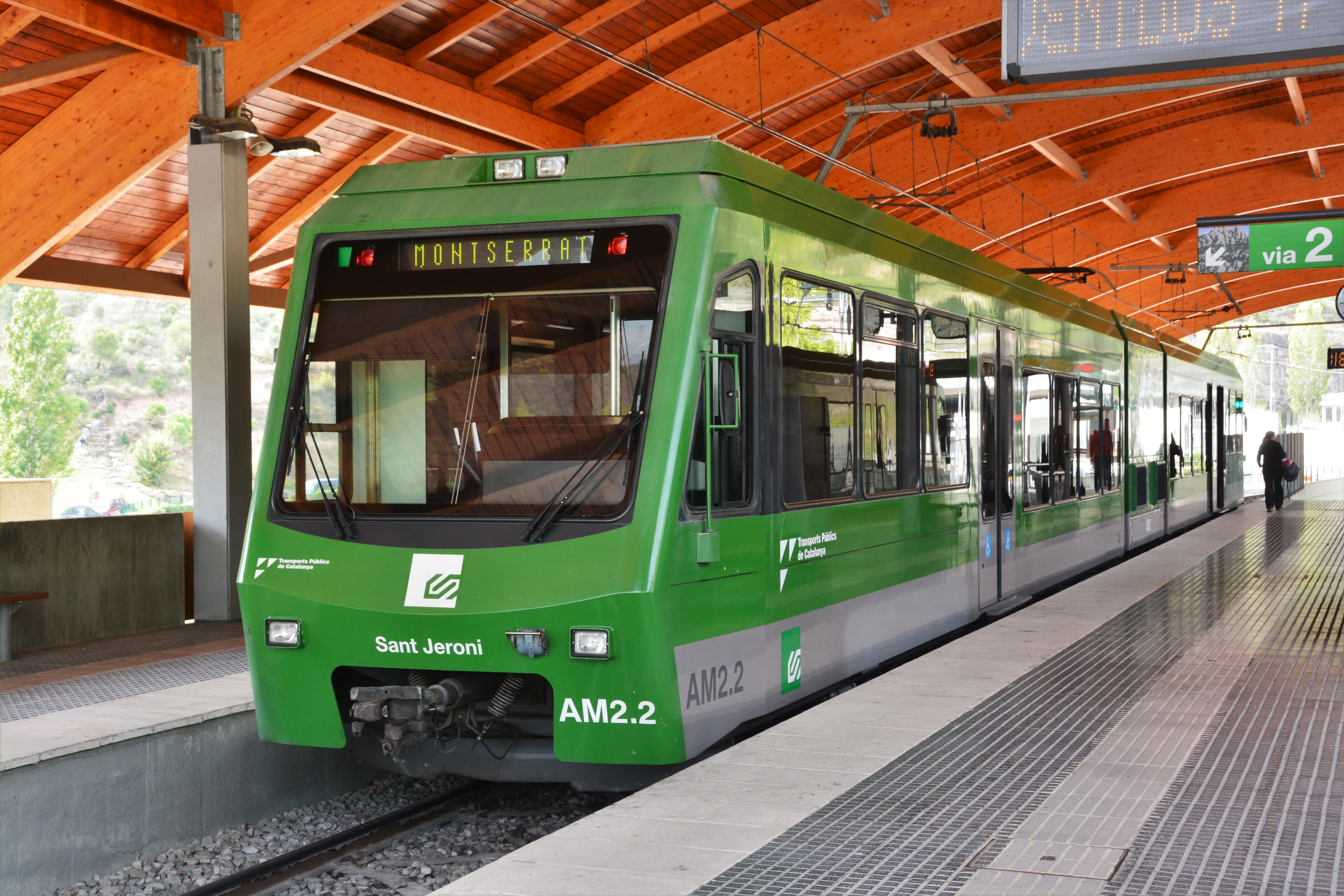
- EMU AM2 of the Montserrat rack-railway

Overview
- Owner: Ferrocarrils de la Generalitat de Catalunya
- Locale: Monistrol de Montserrat, Barcelona

Service
- Operator(s): Ferrocarrils de la Generalitat de Catalunya

History
- Opened: 1892
- Closed: 12 May 1957
- Reopened: 6 June 2003

Technical
- Line length: 5 km (3.1 mi)
- Rack system: Abt
- Track gauge: 1,000 mm (3 ft 3 3/8 in) metre gauge
- Electrification: 1500 V DC Overhead line
- Operating speed: 30 km/h (18.6 mph) on rack 45 km/h (28.0 mph) adhesion
- Maximum incline: 15.6 %

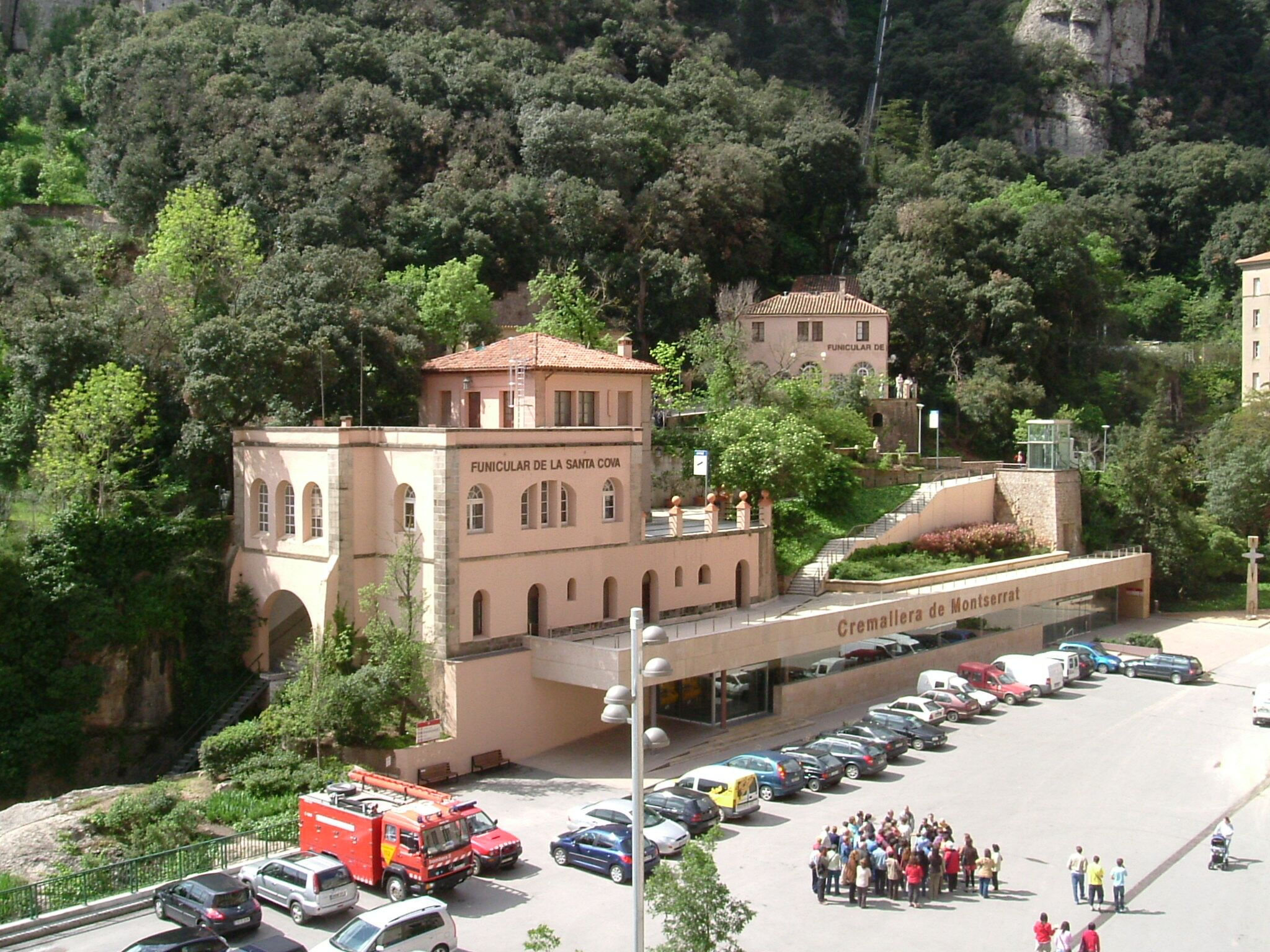
The rack railway upper terminus, with the platforms below the car park. The stations of the two funiculars can also be seen.

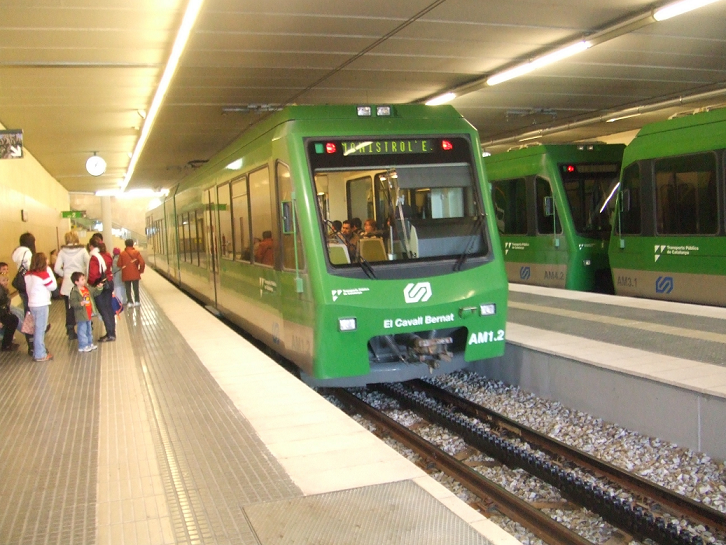
Trains in the underground platforms at the upper terminus.

The Montserrat Rack Railway (Spanish and Catalan: Cremallera de Montserrat, IPA: [kɾəməˈʎeɾə ðə munsəˈrat]) is a mountain railway line north-west of Barcelona in Catalonia. The line runs from Monistrol de Montserrat to the mountain-top monastery of Montserrat.

The line is 5 km (3.1 mi) long and has a rail gauge of 1,000 mm (3 ft 3 3/8 in). The first 1 km (0.6 mi) of the line, between Monistrol FGC station and the only intermediate station at Monistrol Vila, is operated by conventional adhesion. The remainder of the line is operated as a rack railway using the Abt system, overcoming a height difference of 550 m (1,804 ft) with a maximum gradient of 15.6%. The line is electrified with an overhead supply at 1500 V DC.

The line is operated by the Ferrocarrils de la Generalitat de Catalunya (FGC).

== History ==
A line on this route was originally opened in 1892. Competition arrived in 1930, in the form of the Aeri de Montserrat, an aerial cable car that also carries passengers to the monastery. A narrow road also reaches the monastery. After poor financial results and an accident in 1953, the rack railway line was closed on 12 May 1957.

However over time the Aeri and road became unable to handle the increasing number of visitors to the monastery. After many years of planning, a program began to rebuild the rack railway in 2001, and the line re-opened in its modern form on 6 June 2003. In its first 12 months of operation, the Montserrat Rack Railway carried 462,964 passengers.

The heaviest traffic was in May 2024 with near 80,000 passengers and the lightest in February 2004 with 22,996 passengers.

== Equipment ==
The line's most significant engineering work is the Pont del Centenari bridge, which is 480 m (1,575 ft) long and 5 m (16 ft 4.9 in) wide, crossing the River Llobregat. Its nine sections are between 35 m (115 ft) and 55 m (180 ft) long and it was designed as a lattice of steel tubes to give it a light appearance and minimise its visual impact. It is supported by eight pillars with maximum height of 37 m (121 ft).

The line is operated by six low-floor electric motor coaches of type Stadler GTW, built by Stadler Rail in Switzerland. The cars are numbered AM1-AM5 (originally built for Montserrat) and A10 (originally built for Núria Rack Railway; transferred to Montserrat in June 2020) and named after local peaks. These cars are equipped for adhesion and rack propulsion and can each carry up to 200 passengers. They are air-conditioned and have panorama windows offering a good view over the environment. Trains run at up to 30 km/h (18.6 mph) on the rack section and 45 km/h (28.0 mph) on the adhesion section. The line also has a 1930 built electric locomotive, E4, transferred from the Vall de Núria Rack Railway for use on works trains.

== Operation ==
Both the rack railway and the Aeri connect with the FGC's Llobregat–Anoia line railway from Barcelona Plaça d'Espanya station to Manresa. The rack railway connects at Monistrol de Montserrat, also known as Monistrol Central. A track connection is provided at Monistrol to allow rack railway cars to run to and from their depot, which is in nearby Martorell.

An hourly service is operated between Monistrol-Enllaç and the summit, connecting with FGC trains to and from Barcelona and Manresa. Additional trains operate between Monistrol Vila, where the line has a car park with 1000 spaces, and the summit.

The FGC also operates two funicular railways from near the summit station of the rack railway. The Funicular de Sant Joan ascends to the mountain top, whilst the Funicular de Santa Cova descends to a shrine lower down the mountain.
