= Ricardo de Pedraza =

Spanish Paralympic athlete (born 1970)

Personal information
- Full name: Ricardo de Pedraza Losa
- Nationality: Spanish
- Born: 28 August 1970 (age 55)

Sport
- Country: Spain
- Sport: Track and field
- Disability class: B1
Medal record
Paralympic athletics
Representing Spain
European Championships
Gold medal – first place	2012 Stadskanaal	5000m T11

Ricardo de Pedraza Losa (Note: In this Spanish name, the first or paternal surname is De Pedraza and the second or maternal family name is Losa.) (born 28 August 1970) is a vision impaired B1/T11 Spanish Paralympic track and field competitor. He represented Spain at the 2012 Summer Paralympics, finishing eleventh in the 5,000 meter event. He has held several Spanish national records in long-distance events.

== Personal ==
De Pedraza is from Talavera de la Reina, Toledo [20]. In 2012, he was living in Castilla-La Mancha. He has a vision impairment, having lost his vision when he was 36 years old. In 2012, he was living in Castilla-La Mancha. In 2013, de Pedraza was a student studying physiotherapy. In November 2013, he participated in a sports conference at the Open University of Talavera.

== Track and field ==
A B1 classified competitor, de Pedraza is a member of CCM-Club Athletics Toledo. He has held the Spanish national record in the 5,000 and 10,000 meters. He has used Oriol Sellarès Martínez as a guide runner.

De Pedraza competed in the 2009 Spanish national athletics championships, medaling in the 5,000 and 10,000 meter events. In winning the 5,000 meters, he also set a new national Spanish record for the B1 classification. In 2010, he had a sports scholarship from the Castilla-La Mancha Olímpica (CLAMO) program run by the regional government. He also the scholarship in 2012. At the 2011 IPC Athletics World Championships, he finished fifth in the 10,000 meter event and sixth in the 5,000 meters. Competing in the European Championships in June 2012, he finished in first place in the 5,000 meters with a time of 16:43.03.

De Pedraza competed at the 2012 Summer Paralympics in London, finishing eleventh in the 5,000 meters. Following the Games, he was congratulated by Castilian-La Mancha's Minister of Education, Culture and Sports, Martial Marin.

In June 2013, de Pedraza competed in the Albacete Half Marathon with guide runners Juan Antonio Araujo and Antonio Vicente Criado. The race was his first major event since the 2012 Summer Paralympics. In September 2013, he participated in the 18th running of the Quixote de Castilla-La Mancha Maraton in the half marathon event. He ran with guide runners David Magán and Antonio Vicente Criado. In October 2013, he participated in the training day for the XVII Alcázar de San Juan Half Marathon with guide runners David Magán of the Club Atletismo San Pablo and Antonio Vicente Criado of Asociación Deportiva Runners San Miguel. In November 2013, he ran in his first marathon when he ran the Valencia Marathon with a time of 2:57:14. He had two guide runners for the race, Antonio Vicente Criado and David Magán. The time qualified him for the 2014 London World Cup.
