= Granada–Sierra Nevada railway =

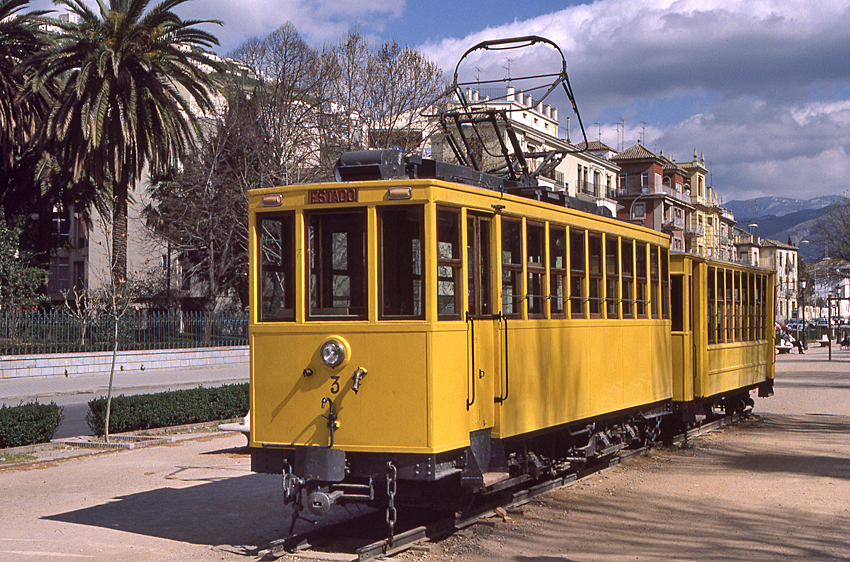
- Sierra Nevada tram 3 and trailer 15

Overview
- Native name: Ferrocarril de Granada A Sierra Nevada
- Status: Closed
- Locale: Granada
- Termini: Puente Verde; La Estrella, Barranco de San Juan
- Stations: Güéjar Sierra, Maitena

Service
- Type: Light rail
- Operator(s): GSN (1925-1931); Estado (1931-1965); FEVE (1965-1974)
- Depot(s): Granada
- Rolling stock: 4 motor cars; 6 trailers; 14 freight cars

History
- Opened: 21 February 1925
- Extended: 1956
- Closed: 20 January 1974

Technical
- Line length: 21.7 km (13.5 mi)
- Track gauge: 750 mm (2 ft 5 1/2 in)
- Electrification: 1200 V DC
- Highest elevation: 1,170 m (3,840 ft)

The Granada–Sierra Nevada railway was a Spanish 750 mm (2 ft 5 1/2 in) gauge narrow gauge railway that operated over 21.7 km (13.5 mi) of track. The original 18 km (11 mi) section was opened between Granada and Maitena in 1925, with an extension to Barranco de San Juan in 1956. The line closed in 1974.

== History ==
The line was the idea of a Spanish grandee; Duque de San Pedro, Julio Quesada, a local entrepreneur who operated factories, luxury hotels and a hydro-electric power station. He was described as "having a string of medieval titles as long as the railway"! The line was intended to connect the city of Granada to a hotel the Duque wanted to build in the Maitena valley.

The line (and the hotel) never made a profit and struggled on, being supported by the income of the Duque's other enterprises. After a tram workers strike in 1931, the line was taken over by the Estado national railway operating company. Operation passed to FEVE in 1965. The line finally closed on 20 January 1974.

After the Spanish Civil War, it had been intended to connect the railway to the mines at La Estrella by a cable car system. Despite the funding being authorised by the Cortes in 1951, it was never built.

== Rolling Stock ==
The railway was an electric railway and operated on a 1200 V DC system. In 1958 it had 4 motor cars, 6 trailers and 14 freight cars. Motor car 3 and trailer 15 were preserved on the Paseo del Salón in Granada but the trailer was damaged by fire in 1993.

== See also ==
- Narrow gauge railways in Spain
- List of town tramway systems in Spain
