= Santa Cova Funicular =

Coordinates: 41°35′32.72″N 1°50′22.05″E

Overview
- Locale: Monistrol de Montserrat, Catalonia, Spain
- Stations: 2

Service
- Type: Funicular
- Operator(s): Ferrocarrils de la Generalitat de Catalunya (Catalan Government Railways, FGC)

History
- Opened: 1929
- Closed: 2000
- Reopened: 2001

Technical
- Line length: 0.262 km (0.163 mi)
- Track gauge: 1,000 mm (3 ft 3 3/8 in)
- Maximum incline: 56.5%

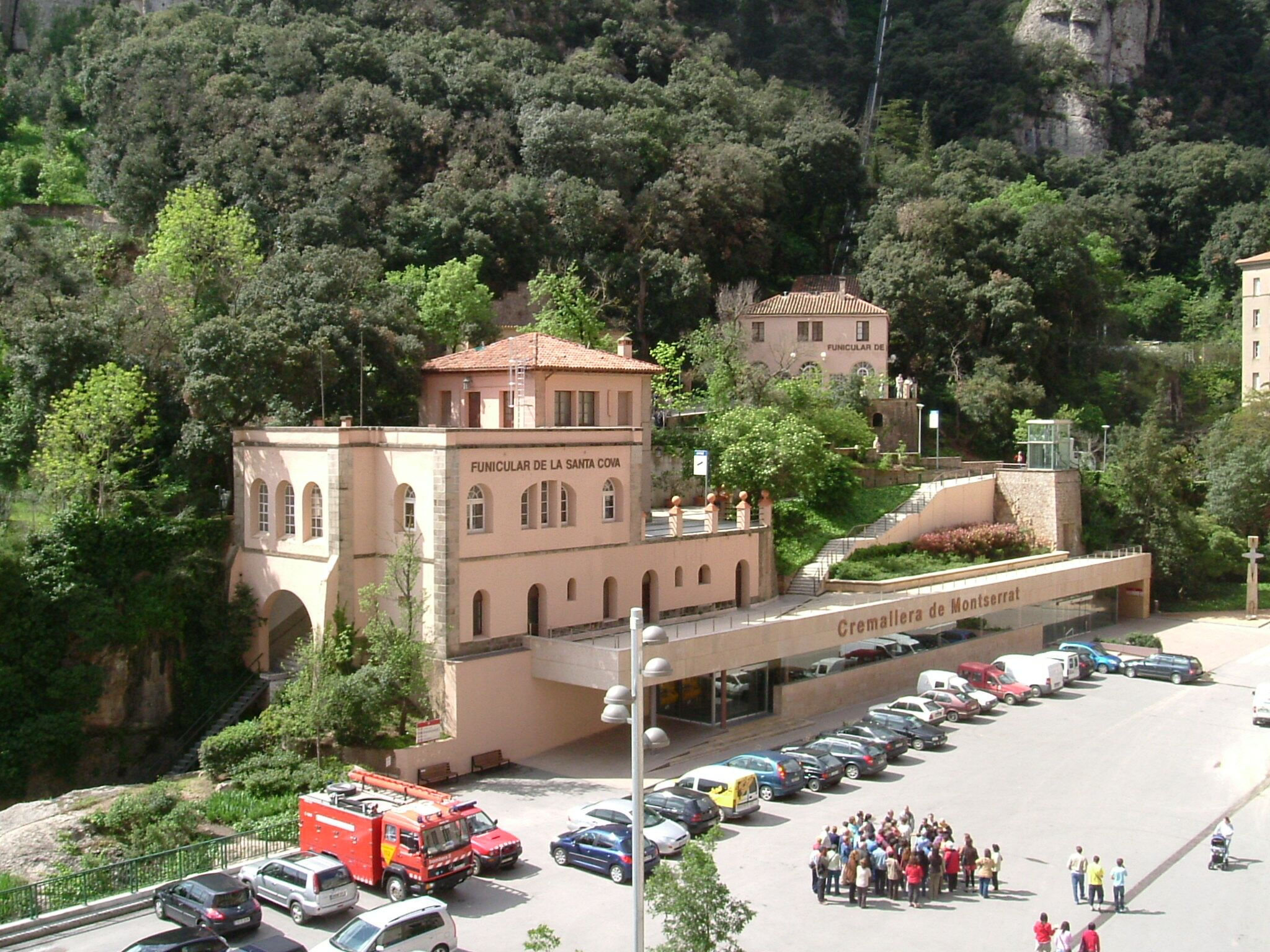
The upper station of the Santa Cova funicular. The lower station of the Sant Joan funicular can be seen in the background, and the rack railway upper terminus is below the car park.

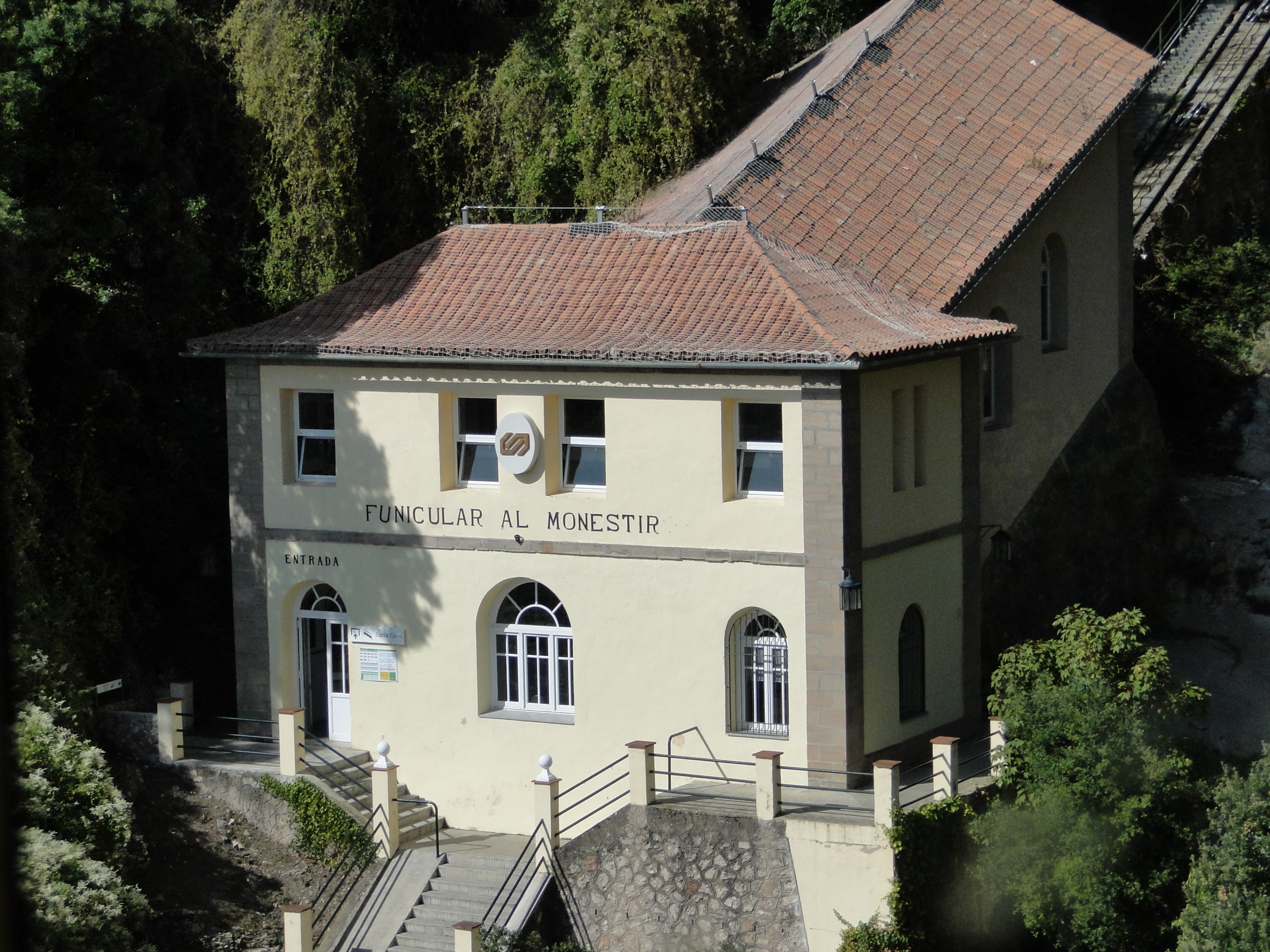
Lower station of the funicular.

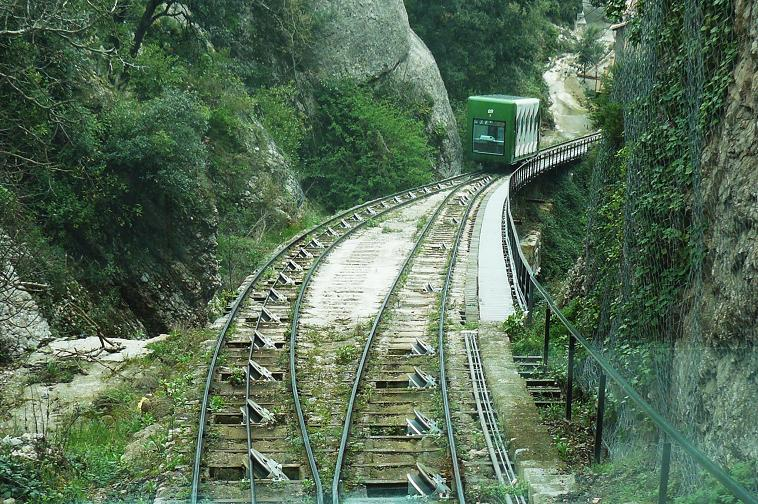
Cars at the passing loop.

The Santa Cova Funicular (Catalan: Funicular de la Santa Cova; Spanish: Funicular de La Santa Cova) is a funicular railway at Montserrat, near Barcelona in Catalonia, Spain. The line descends from the monastery, and the upper terminus of the Montserrat Rack Railway, on a continuous curve to a lower station that gives access, via a path, to Santa Cova, a shrine lower down the mountain.

The funicular has the following technical parameters:

- Length: 262 m (860 ft)
- Height: 118 m (387 ft)
- Maximum steepness: 56.5 %
- Cars: 2
- Capacity: 90 passengers per car
- Configuration: Single track with passing loop
- Travel time: 2.5 minutes
- Track gauge: 1,000 mm (3 ft 3 3/8 in) metre gauge
- Traction: Electrical

Although the line operates two cars, in normal service only one carries passengers, whilst the other simply acts as a counterweight.

The line is operated by the Ferrocarrils de la Generalitat de Catalunya (Catalan Government Railways, FGC), who also operate the Montserrat Rack Railway and the Funicular de Sant Joan funicular railway on Montserrat Mountain, together with two other funicular railways and a significant suburban railway system in and around Barcelona.

The line originally opened in 1929 and was passed to the FGC in 1986. It was renovated in 1991 with the retention of its original stepped and wooden bodied cars. One of these was damaged by floods in 2000, as was the lower station. When the line reopened in 2001, new panoramic cars, similar to those already in use on the nearby Funicular de Sant Joan, were provided.
