= Valdepeñas–Puertollano railway =

Former railway in Spain

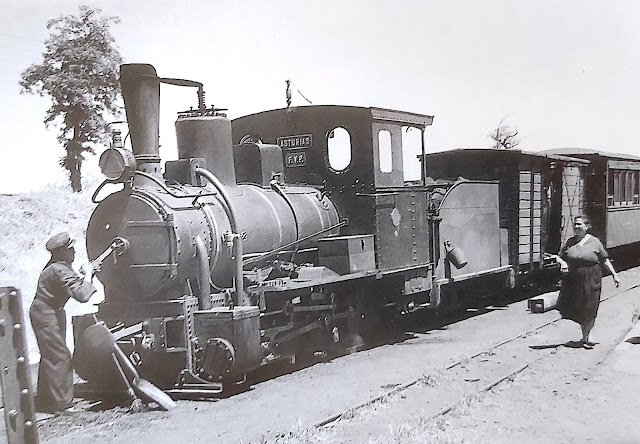
The train from Valdepeñas to Puertollano, 1962

The Valdepeñas–Puertollano railway was a Spanish 750 mm (2 ft 5 1/2 in) gauge narrow gauge railway that operated between Valdepeñas and Puertollano. The railway opened in 1924 and closed in 1963, and operated over 78 kilometres (48 mi) of track. Locomotives included 9 steam locomotives of 0-8-0 and 0-6-0 types manufactured by Couillet, Arnold Jung and Orenstein & Koppel, and one diesel locomotive made by Metalúrgica S. Martin. There were also 17 passenger cars and 160 freight cars.

== See also ==
- Narrow gauge railways in Spain
