= Sant Joan Funicular =

Coordinates: 41°35′19.27″N 1°50′0.03″E

Overview
- Status: In use
- Locale: Monistrol de Montserrat, Catalonia, Spain
- Stations: 2

Service
- Type: Funicular
- Operator(s): Ferrocarrils de la Generalitat de Catalunya (Catalan Government Railways, FGC)

History
- Opened: 1918
- Closed: 2017
- Reopened: 2018

Technical
- Line length: 0.503 km (0.313 mi)
- Track gauge: 1,000 mm (3 ft 3 3/8 in)
- Maximum incline: 65.2%

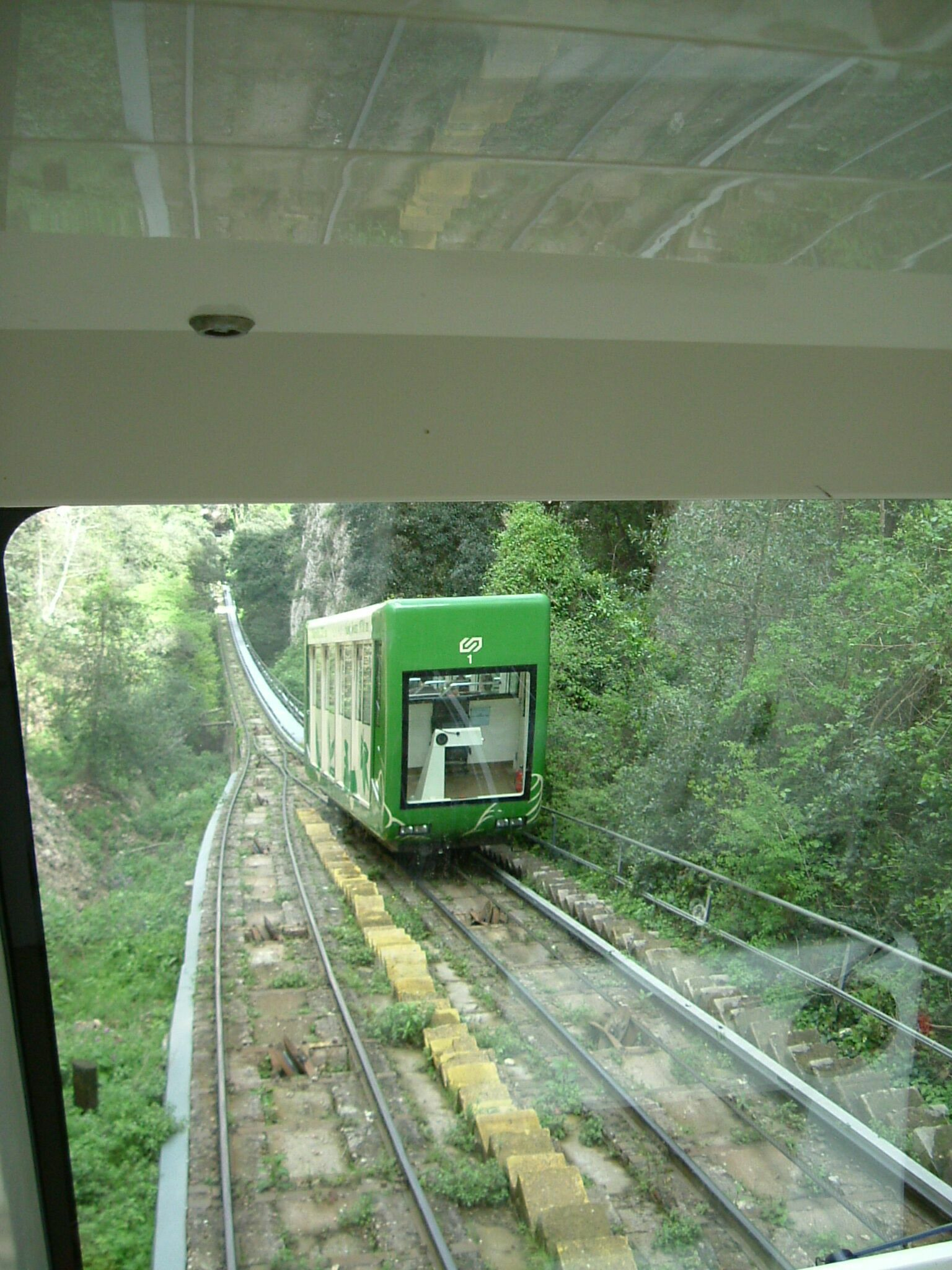
Cars of the Sant Joan funicular.

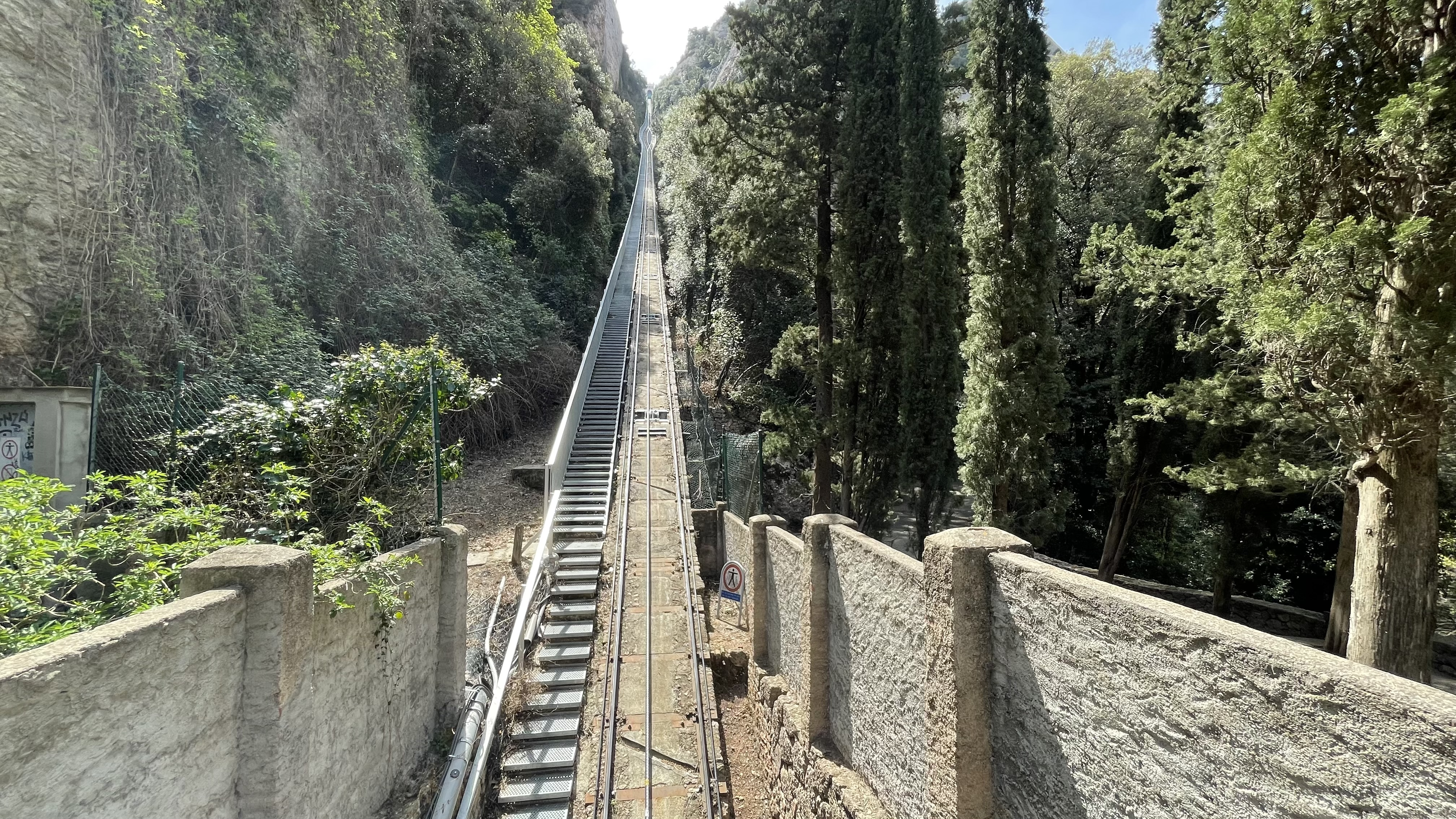
The funicular, seen from a footbridge over the bottom station.

The Sant Joan Funicular (Catalan: Funicular de Sant Joan; Spanish: Funicular de San Juan) is a funicular railway at Montserrat, near Barcelona in Catalonia, Spain. The line connects the monastery, and the upper terminus of the Montserrat Rack Railway, with sacred sites, walking trails and viewpoints higher up the mountain. With a maximum gradient of 65%, it is the steepest funicular in Spain.

== Overview ==
The funicular has the following technical parameters:

- Length: 503 m (1,650 ft)
- Height: 248 m (814 ft)
- Maximum steepness: 65.2 %
- Cars: 2
- Capacity: 60 passengers per car
- Configuration: Single track with passing loop
- Travel time: 6 minutes
- Track gauge: 1,000 mm (3 ft 3 3/8 in) metre gauge
- Traction: Electrical

=== Operation ===
The line is operated by the Ferrocarrils de la Generalitat de Catalunya (Catalan Government Railways, FGC), who also operate the Montserrat Rack Railway and the Funicular de la Santa Cova funicular railway on Montserrat Mountain, together with two other funicular railways and a significant suburban railway system in and around Barcelona.

== History ==
The line was originally built in 1918; when opened, it was powered by electricity from the nearby Monistrol de Montserrat plant, owned by Electra Gomis. It was modified to increase capacity in 1926. In 1986 it passed to the FGC, who modernised it in 1997, providing new panoramic cars with transparent roofs.

Between November 2017 and March 2018, the line was closed for maintenance on the winding gear.
