= Ferrocarrils de la Generalitat de Catalunya =

Railway company in Catalonia, Spain

- Type: Government-owned company
- Industry: Railway
- Founded: 5 September 1979; 47 years ago
- Headquarters: Barcelona, Catalonia (Spain)
- Key people: Antoni Segarra i Barreto (President)
- Number of employees: 1534 (2008)
- Subsidiaries: FGC Operadora; FGC Infraestructures; FGC Enginyeria; FGC Turisme i Muntanya
- Website: www.fgc.cat

Ferrocarrils de la Generalitat de Catalunya
Technical
- Track gauge: 600 mm (1 ft 11 5/8 in); 1,000 mm (3 ft 3 3/8 in) metre gauge; 1,435 mm (4 ft 8 1/2 in) standard gauge; 1,668 mm (5 ft 5 21/32 in)
- Electrification: 1500V DC (Barcelona-Vallès line, Llobregat-Anoia line (except freight lines)) Overhead catenary

Ferrocarrils de la Generalitat de Catalunya (Eastern Catalan: [ˌfɛrukəˈrilz ðə lə ʒənəɾəliˈtad də kətəˈluɲə], "Catalan Government Railways"; Spanish: Ferrocarriles de la Generalidad de Cataluña), or FGC, is a railway company which operates several unconnected lines in Catalonia, Spain.

The lines operated include metro and commuter lines in and around the city of Barcelona, tourist mountain railways, and rural railway lines. They include 3.5 kilometres (2.2 mi) of 600 mm (1 ft 11 5/8 in) gauge route, 140 kilometres (87 mi) of 1,000 mm (3 ft 3 3/8 in) metre gauge route, 42 kilometres (26 mi) of 1,435 mm (4 ft 8 1/2 in) standard gauge route, and 89 kilometres (55 mi) of broad gauge route, making the FGC one of the few railway companies to operate on four different gauges.

Whilst most lines are conventional adhesion railways, the FGC also operates two rack railways and four funicular railways.

In 2018, the network carried 87.2 million passengers.

== History ==
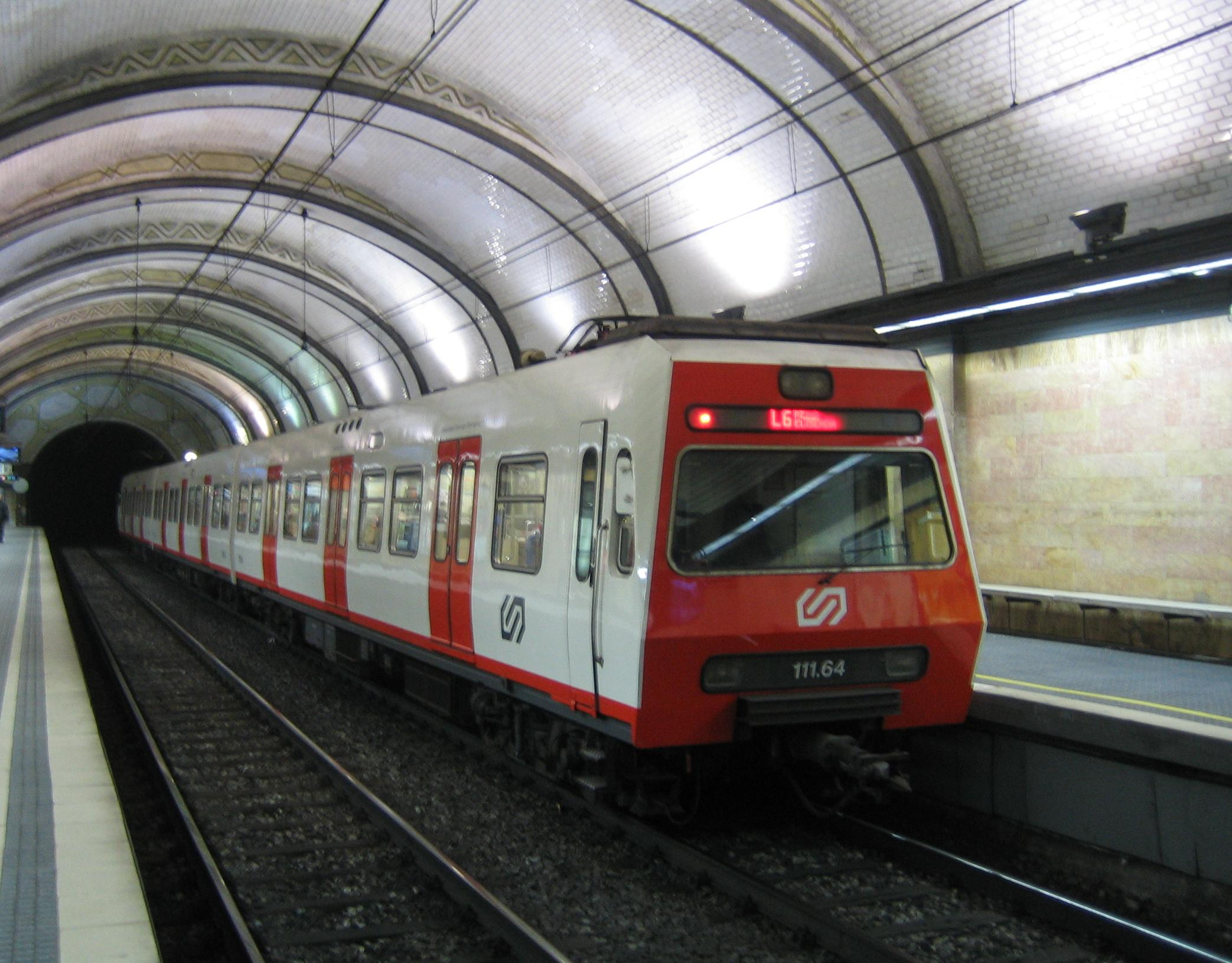
FGC train (111 series) in Barcelona.

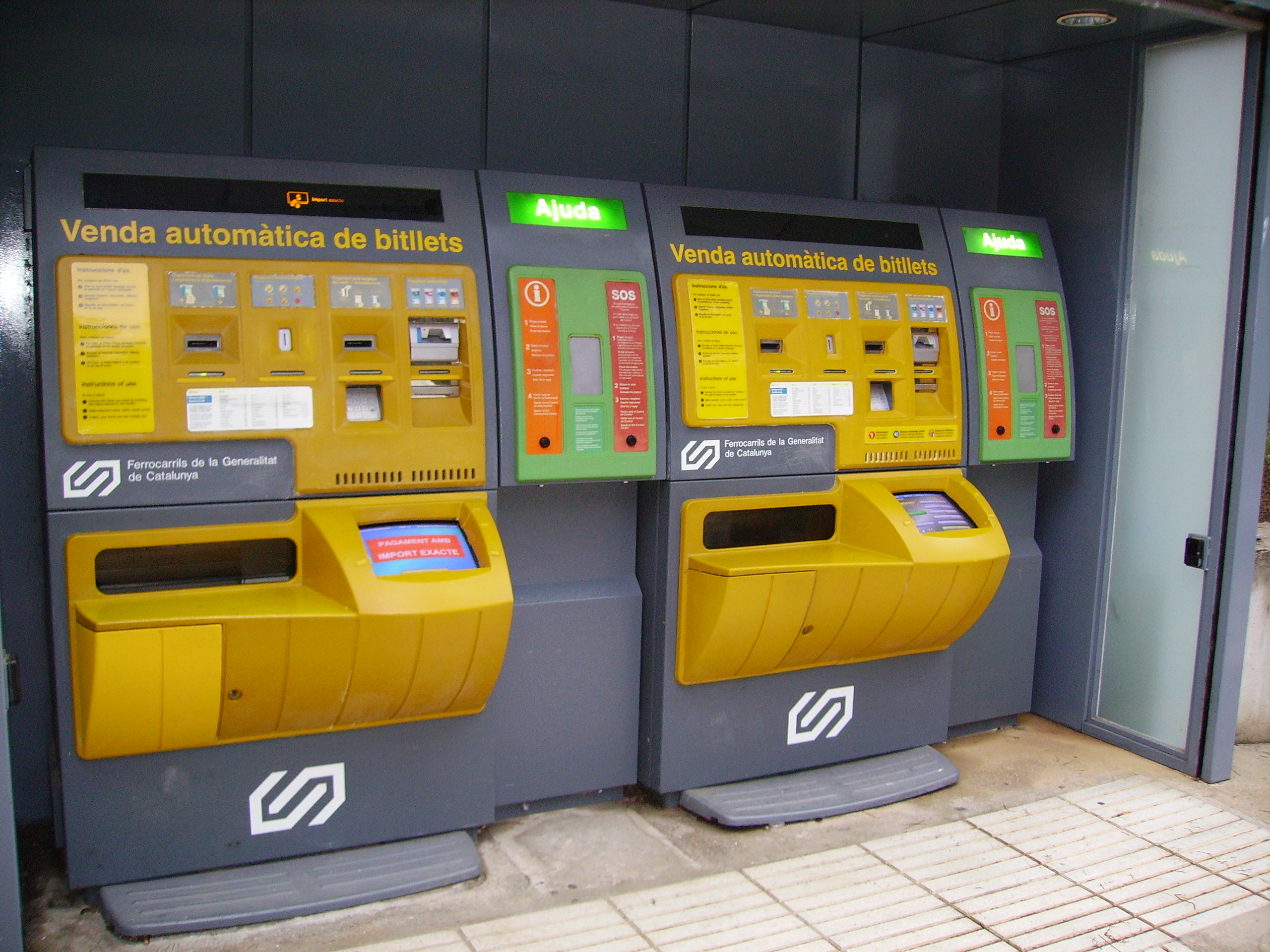
Ticket vending machines

FGC was founded on 5 September 1979 to manage lines whose ownership was transferred from the state-owned FEVE to the Generalitat of Catalonia in 1978 as part of the process of regional devolution under the Spanish Constitution of 1978. Its oldest line, the standard gauge Línia Barcelona-Vallès however dates back to 1863 which was built and operated by Companyia del Ferrocarril de Barcelona a Sarrià from 1863 until 1874, and Ferrocarril de Sarrià a Barcelona (FSB) (with Ferrocarrils de Catalunya (FCC)) from 1874 until severe financial difficulties forced FSB and FCC to be acquired by FEVE in 1977, which operated it until FGC took over the line in 1979. The second oldest line the Llobregat–Anoia line was opened in 1892 as an interurban tram using metre gauge tracks, which was taken over by the Companyia General dels Ferrocarrils Catalans (CGFC) in 1912 and transformed it into a train line; CGFC being later taken over by FSB and FCC, followed by the broad gauge Lleida – La Pobla de Segur line in 1951 and operated by Renfe until it was transferred to FGC in 2005–2010.

== Barcelona metro and commuter lines ==
FGC operates some of the commuter rail network in Barcelona. Voice announcements and signs on trains and stations of lines operated by FGC are exclusively in the Catalan language, unlike in the lines operated by Transports Metropolitans de Barcelona and Renfe which remain bilingual or trilingual (Catalan, Spanish or "Castellano" and eventually English) in order to serve a large and diverse userbase. All lines are overhead DC electrified at 1.5 kV. There are two distinct (and separate) systems:

- The Metro del Vallès and Línia de Balmes are 8 standard-gauge lines that run from Plaça de Catalunya railway station to Av. Tibidabo (L7, brown on the map), Sarrià (L6, purple) and Sant Cugat del Vallès (S5), and then on to Sabadell (S2) or Terrassa (S1). In rush hour some of them only arrive at Universitat Auntònoma (S6) or at Rubí (S7). The eighth line is the L12, a shuttle subway service between Sarrià and Reina Elisenda.
- The Metro del Baix Llobregat and Llobregat–Anoia line are metre-gauge lines that run from the Plaça d'Espanya railway station to Molí Nou-Ciutat Cooperativa (in Sant Boi de Llobregat, L8 – pink on the map), Martorell-Enllaç (S8) and then on to Olesa de Montserrat (S4) and Manresa (R5), or Igualada (R6). There is also an unelectrified metre-gauge freight line to the port of Barcelona, which diverges from the main line between Sant Boi and Cornellà. Along the Llobregat valley, FGC runs on the right bank through Sant Boi de Llobregat, Sant Vicenç dels Horts, Pallejà and on to Martorell (Enllaç), whereas the broad gauge line R4 runs on the left bank through towns Sant Joan Despí, Sant Feliu de Llobregat, Molins de Rei and on to Martorell.

The line numbering is as follows:

- L-prefixed lines (L for Línia – line) are treated as part of the Barcelona metro system, which consists of L1-L5 for the metro proper, L6-L8 on the FGC, L9 and L10 partially open and partially under construction, and L11, a short light rail line system in the northwest – see Barcelona Metro. L6 and L7 used to be known as U6 and U7 (U for Urbà – urban), while L8 was formerly known as S3.
- S-prefixed lines (S for Suburbà) are suburban lines, extending into metropolitan fare zone 2 or 3.
- R-prefixed lines (R for Rodalies) are Interurban lines, extending beyond zone 3. Lines R1-R4, R7 and R8 are run by Rodalies de Catalunya (currently operated by Renfe), R5 and R6 are run and operated by FGC.

== Mountain railway, tourist and funicular lines ==
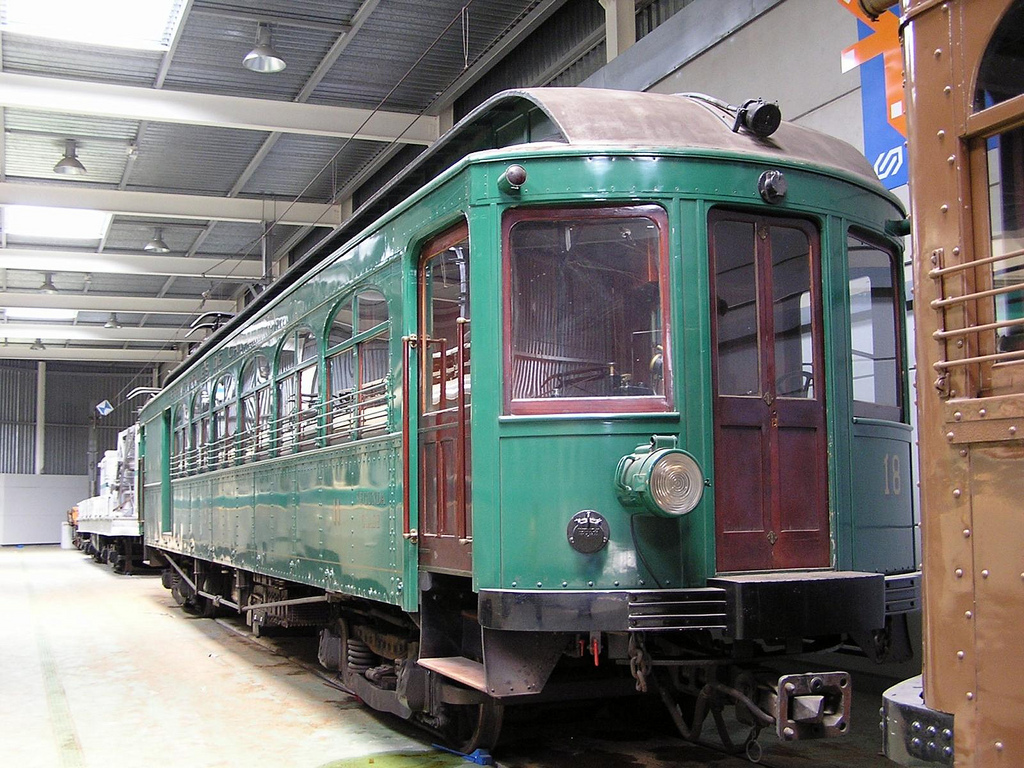
Historic Brill interurban carriage of Ferrocarrils de Catalunya. Some of these trains were sold to Hershey Electric Railway in Cuba in the 1990s, where they still remain in service today.

The FGC operates three mountain railway lines:

- The Montserrat Rack Railway, which runs from Monistrol, on FGC's suburban line to Manresa (R5), to the mountain-top monastery of Montserrat. This line re-opened in 2003, having opened in 1892 and closed in 1957. It is of metre gauge using the Abt rack railway system.
- The Vall de Núria Rack Railway, in the Pyrenees mountains of northern Catalonia. This is also of metre gauge using the Abt rack railway system, and the two lines, although many kilometres apart, occasionally swap stock.
- The Ferrocarril Turístic de l'Alt Llobregat, which runs from La Pobla de Lillet to Clot del Moro, also in northern Catalonia. This line is of 600 mm (1 ft 11 5/8 in) gauge, and operates using adhesion only.

The FGC also operates four funicular railways:

- The Funicular de Sant Joan, from the upper station of the Montserrat Rack Railway to the summit of the mountain of Montserrat.
- The Funicular de Santa Cova, also from the upper station of the Montserrat Rack Railway to a nearby shrine.
- The Funicular de Gelida, connecting the town of Gelida with its railway station.
- The Funicular de Vallvidrera, connecting a station on the Metro del Vallès suburban line to the top of the Tibidabo hill.

== Broad-gauge lines ==
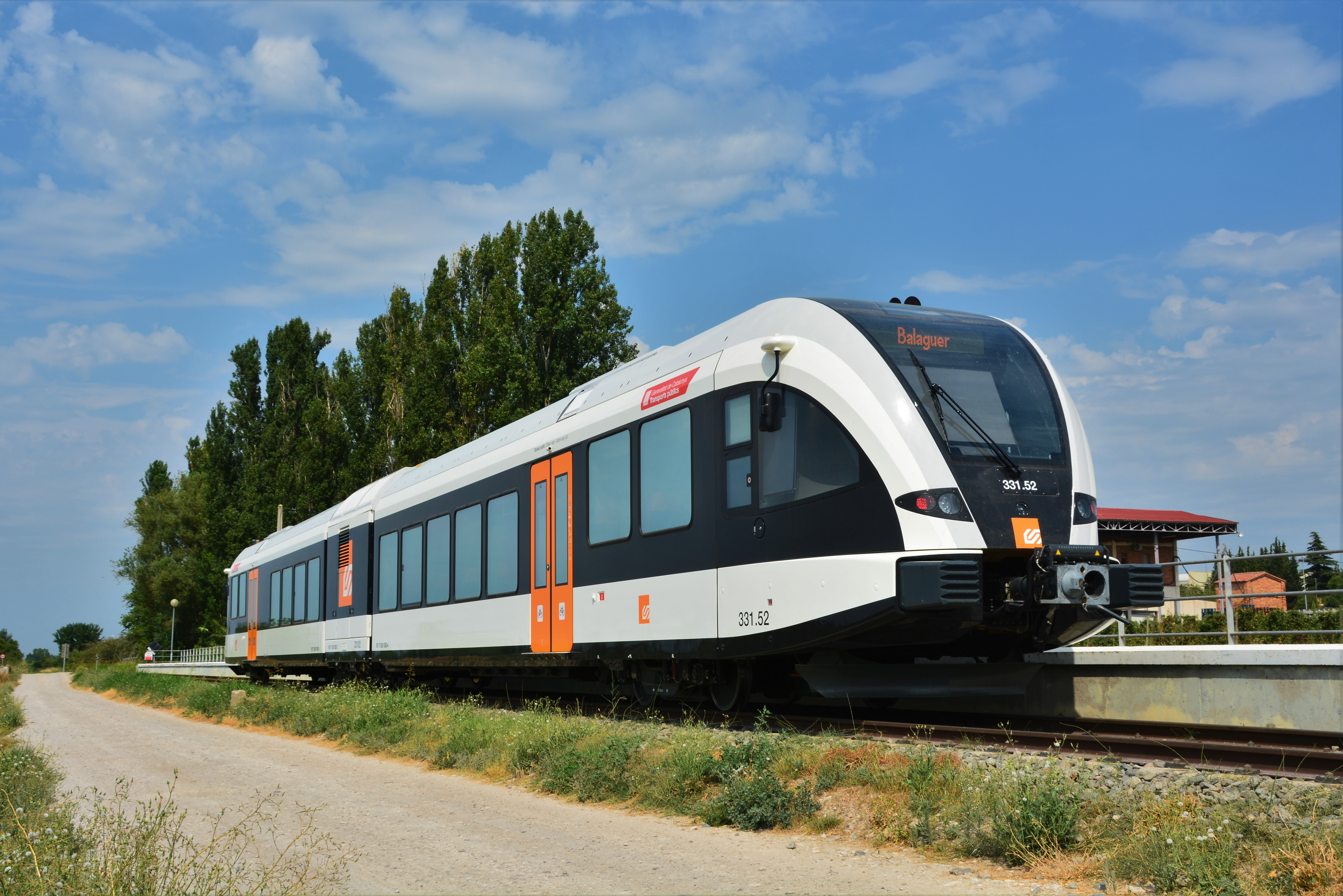
New Stadler GTW train undergoing testing on the Lleida – La Pobla de Segur line in July 2016.

On 1 January 2005, ownership of the non-electrified broad-gauge line from Lleida to La Pobla de Segur passed from Renfe to FGC. This is the most derelict line in Catalonia – the stretch from Lleida to Balaguer had been upgraded (using second-hand rails) in the recent past, but from Balaguer northwards the track was in an appalling state. FGC has a number of plans for this line, including increasing the service frequency from three trains a day to a 30-minute service from Balaguer to Lleida, along the lines of a commuter railway; replacing all the rails and sleepers; introducing new trains to replace the ancient diesel stock currently used; and promotion of the line to tourists (it passes through some scenic countryside at its northern end). There were even plans to extend the line to the Pyrenees and possibly on to connect with railways in France – the plan when the line was built, but never carried out. Recent budget cuts had left the line in a worse state than it was on Renfe days, with then three daily services from Lleida to Balaguer and only one running the whole length up to La Pobla de Segur.

As of 2015, the service on the line was as follows:

- Monday to Friday: 1 train Lleida – La Pobla de Segur and return (RL2), 3 trains Lleida – Balaguer and return (RL1)
- Saturday: 1 train Lleida – La Pobla de Segur and return, 2 trains Lleida – Balaguer and return
- Sunday: 1 train Lleida – La Pobla de Segur and return, 2 trains Lleida – Balaguer and return

However, as of 2024, the service has improved, following the introduction of new Stadler GTW trains. There are now 10 trains a day between Lleida and Balaguer every day, and 5 trains a day between Lleida and La Pobla de Segur on weekdays (2 on Saturdays, and 3 on Sundays and holidays).

== Freight ==
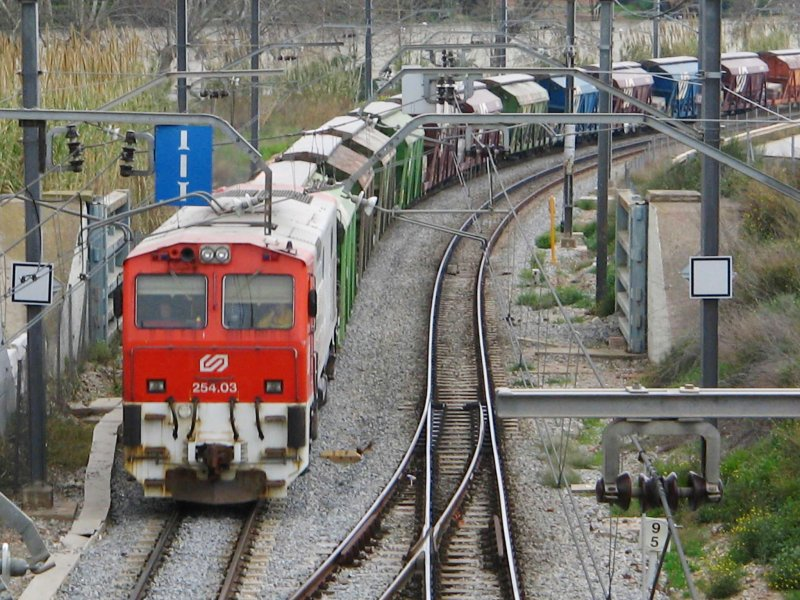
FGC locomotive 254.03 hauling freight cars near Sant Boi

FGC currently operates two types of freight services on the Llobregat–Anoia line; one of which carries potash and salt from Súria and Sallent respectively to Martorell for cleaning and processing before being sent to the Port of Barcelona, and the other carries cars from SEAT's main factory in Martorell to the Port of Barcelona.

In September 2012, FGC announced that it was planning to start operating freight services across the Spanish rail network, as an open access operator. Initial routes would be Barcelona – Sevilla and Barcelona – Madrid.

== See also ==
- Ferrocarriles Españoles de Vía Estrecha
- History of rail transport in Spain
- List of FGC lines
- Renfe
- Transportation in Spain
