= Montserrat (mountain) =

Mountain range in Catalonia, Spain

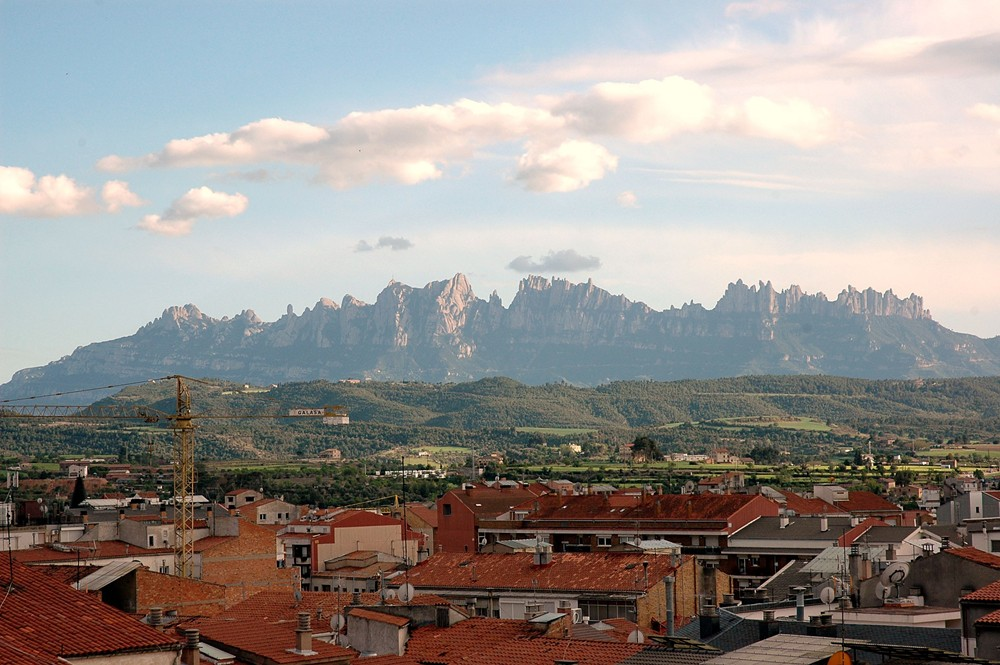
- Montserrat seen from Manresa

Highest point
- Elevation: 1,236 m (4,055 ft)
- Coordinates: 41°35′30″N 1°50′16″E

Geography
- Location within Catalonia
- Location: Bages, Anoia, Baix Llobregat, Catalonia, Spain
- Parent range: Catalan Pre-Coastal Range

Geology
- Mountain type: Conglomerate

Climbing
- Easiest route: Via road BP-1121 from Monistrol de Montserrat

Montserrat (Catalan pronunciation: [munsəˈrat]) is a multi-peaked mountain range near Barcelona, in Catalonia, Spain. It is part of the Catalan Pre-Coastal Range. The main peaks are Sant Jeroni (1,236 m), Montgrós (1,120 m), and Les Agulles (903 m).

It is the site of the Benedictine abbey, Santa Maria de Montserrat, which hosts the Virgin of Montserrat sanctuary.

"Montserrat" literally means "serrated (like the common handsaw) mountain" in Catalan. It describes its peculiar aspect with a multitude of rock formations that are visible from a great distance. The mountain is composed of strikingly pink conglomerate, a form of sedimentary rock. Montserrat was designated as a National Park in 1987. The Monastery of Montserrat which houses the virgin that gives its name to the monastery is also on the mountain, although it is also known as La Moreneta ("the little tan/dark one" in Catalan).

== Hiking and climbing ==
- The highest summit of Montserrat is called Sant Jeroni (Saint Jerome) and stands at 1,236 meters (4,055 feet) above sea-level. It is accessible by hiking trails which connect from the top entrance to the Sant Joan funicular, the monastery, or the base of the mountain. Montserrat is part of the GR footpath 172. The Cavall Bernat 1,111 meters (3,645 feet) is an important rock feature popular with climbers.
- The well-known via ferrata Canal de las Damas (difficulty level D) leads from Collbató through a canal.
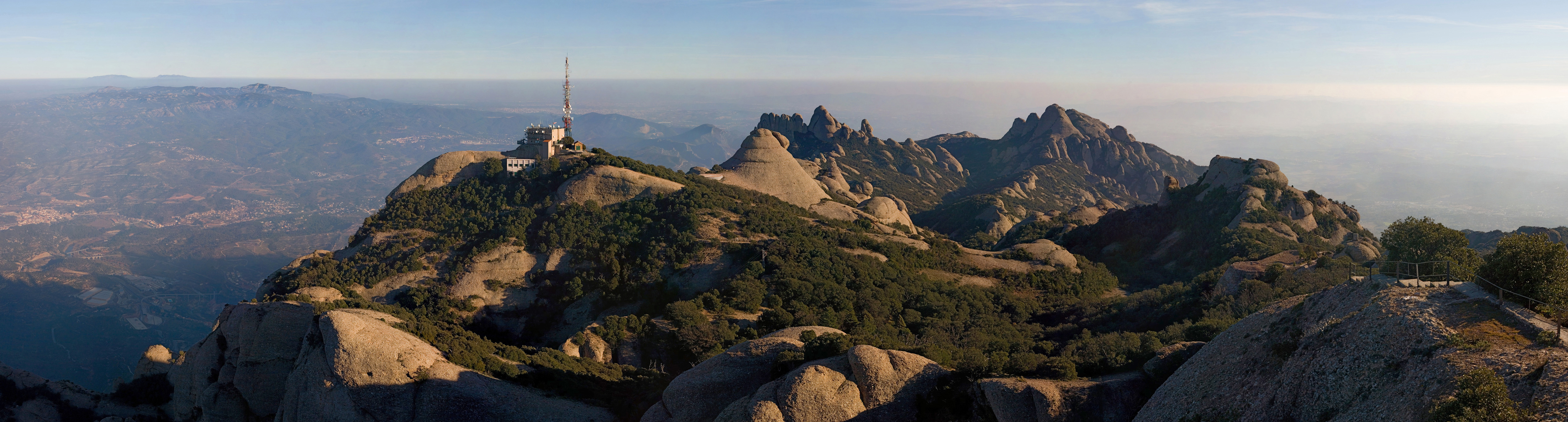
Panorama of the view from the Sant Jeroni summit of Montserrat

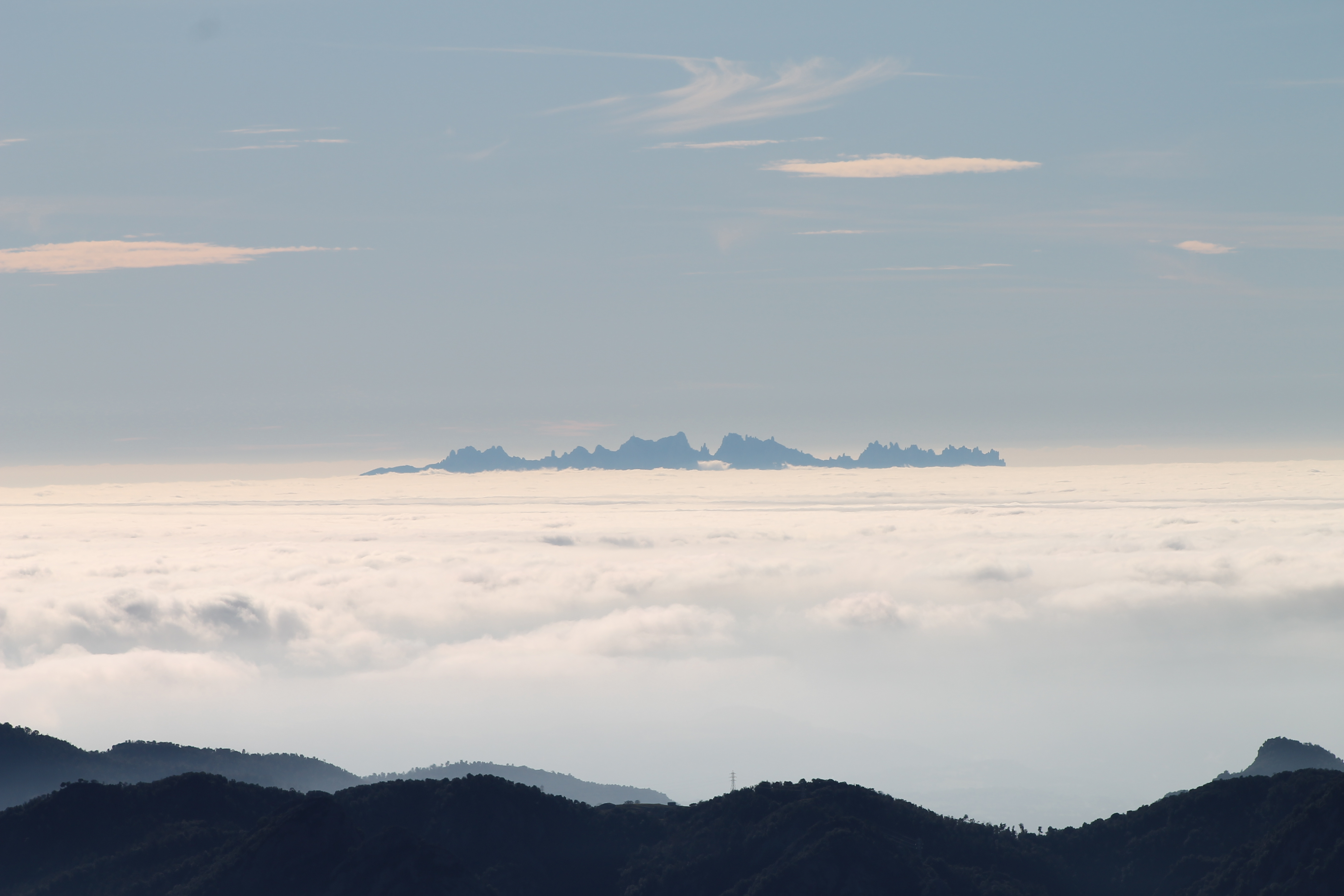
Mountain seen from Puig Lluent with a sea of clouds.

== Geology ==
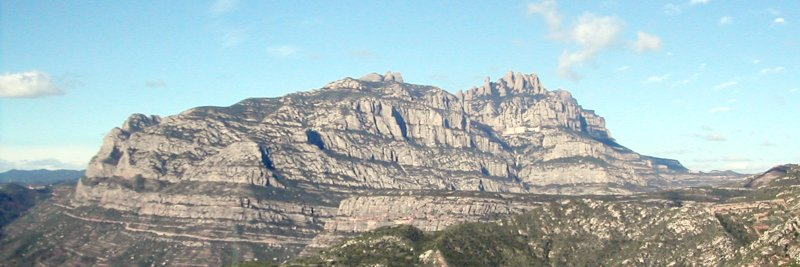
Large-scale layering in the conglomerate sequence

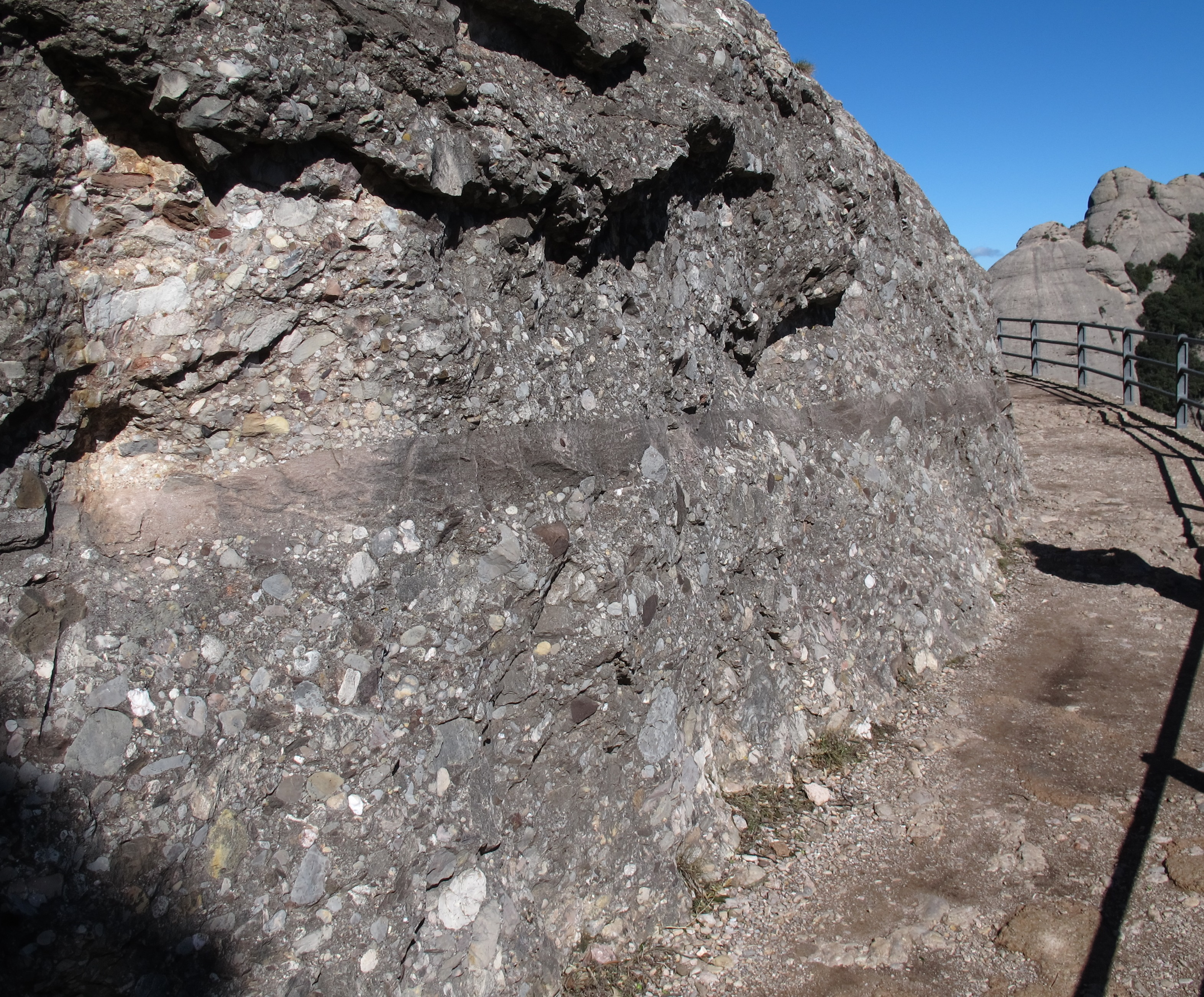
Conglomerate with a rare sandstone layer on the path to Sant Jeroni on the flank of La Gorra Frigia. The conglomerate is polymict, clast-supported and poorly sorted with clasts ranging from pebble to boulder size

Montserrat is formed of conglomerate that was originally deposited in a fan delta at the margin of the Ebro Basin, part of the foreland basin to the Pyrenees, during the middle Eocene. The conglomerate was derived from the uplifting Catalan Coastal Ranges to the southeast of the basin and the clast type is dominated by Triassic sedimentary rocks. The fan had an original size of between 100 and 150 square kilometres. The resistance of the Montserrat conglomerate to erosion compared to the rest of the fill of the Ebro Basin explains its current mountainous nature.

The dominant clast lithology in the conglomerate is limestone and the sequence is cemented by calcite. The presence of so much carbonate in the rock has led to the formation of typical karst landforms, such as cave systems and karst towers.

== Namesakes ==
In 1493, Christopher Columbus named the Caribbean island of Montserrat Santa Maria de Montserrate, after the Virgin of Montserrat. Again, in 1606, the Spanish expedition of Luis Vaéz de Torres charted Mount Ernest island in the Torres Strait as Santa Maria de Montserrate, due to its relatively high peak.

In Bogotá, the Monserrate mountain (3,152 m high) has a funicular and aerial lift similar to those at Montserrat.

In Trinidad, Trinidad and Tobago, the Montserrat Hills are famous for the historic Our Lady of Montserrat Roman Catholic Church in Tortuga. Built in 1878, the wooden church sits on a high ridge offering sweeping views of the Gulf of Paria and is celebrated as the home of Trinidad's "Black Virgin" statue.
