= Monistrol de Montserrat =

- Municipality
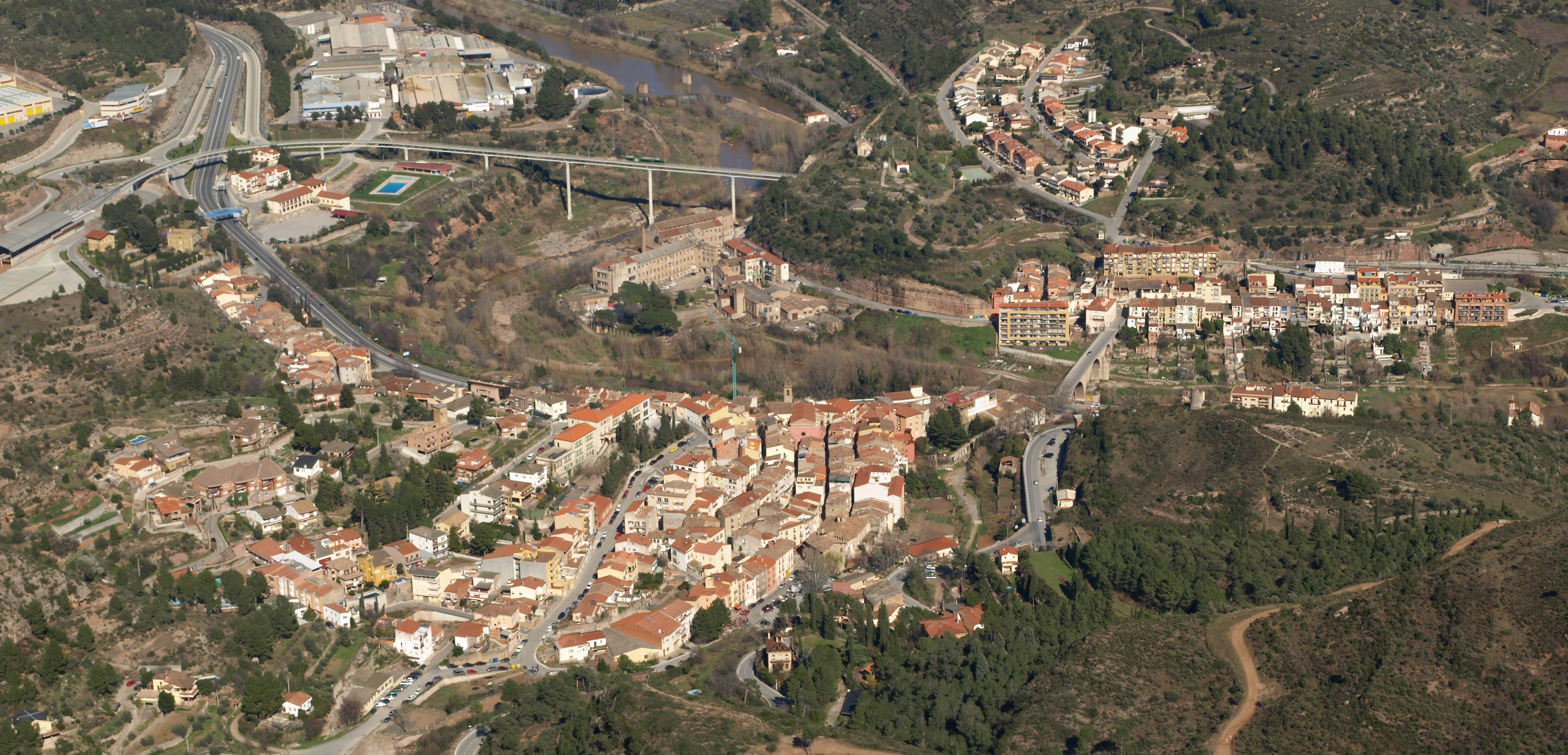

- Flag Coat of arms

- Location in Bages county

- Location within Catalonia Location within Spain
- Coordinates: 41°36′32″N 1°50′31″E
- Sovereign state: Spain
- Community: Catalonia
- Region: Centre
- County: Bages
- Province: Barcelona

Government
  - Mayor: Núria Carreras (2023) (PP)

Area
  - Total: 11.8 km^{2} (4.6 sq mi)
- Elevation: 161 m (528 ft)

Population (2025-01-01)
  - Total: 3,250
  - Density: 275/km^{2} (713/sq mi)
- Demonym(s): Monistrolenc, monistrolenca
- Website: monistroldemontserrat.cat

Monistrol de Montserrat (Catalan pronunciation: [munisˈtɾɔl də munsəˈrat]) is a municipality in Bages county in Catalonia, Spain.

The municipality includes the southern two-thirds of the massif of Montserrat and the famous Benedictine monastery of the same name. The town, known as Montserrat-Vila, is situated on the eastern flank of the massif above the valley of the Llobregat river: it is connected with the monastery (higher up) and with the railway station in the valley (FGC line R5) by the Montserrat Rack Railway (Cremallera de Montserrat). The C-1411 road links the town with Martorell and Manresa. The bridge over the Llobregat river dates from the fourteenth century. The municipality includes a small exclave to the north-west.

== Demography ==
1900	1930	1950	1970	1986	2007
2332	3323	2999	3002	2625	2903
