= Can Batlló (La Bordeta) =

Spanish cotton factory (1877–1965)

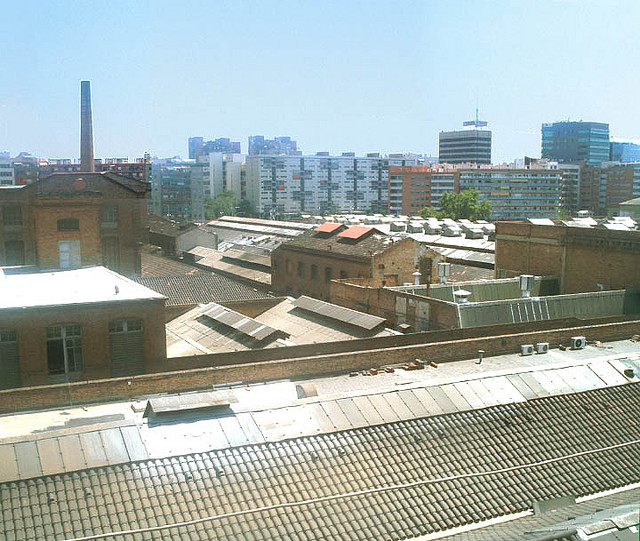
- Can Batlló factory (2005)
- Interactive map of the Can Batlló (La Bordeta) area

General information
- Type: Factory
- Architectural style: Industrial Eclecticism
- Location: La Bordeta in Barcelona, Spain
- Coordinates: 41°22′11″N 2°08′15″W
- Construction started: 1877
- Construction stopped: 1879

Technical details
- Material: Brick

Can Batlló, or the old Joan Batlló Factory is a former industrial complex located close to the Gran Via de les Corts Catalanes, near the square known as Plaça Cerdà. It is composed of the facilities set up for the textile factory created in 1878 by Joan Batlló i Barrera. Towards the end of the 19th century it livened up the La Bordeta neighbourhood in Barcelona. The project was the work of engineer Juan Antonio Molinero.

== History ==
=== Fábrica de Hilados y Tejidos de Algodón, Blanqueo, estampados y aprestos de Juan Batlló ===
Fábrica de Hilados y Tejidos de Algodón, Blanqueo, estampados y aprestos de Juan Batlló was a printing, bleaching, and cotton-weaving spinning mill founded in 1878 in Sants neighbourhood, which Barcelona had recently annexed. The factory was established by Joan Batlló i Barrera, one of the brothers of the powerful Batlló family.

In 1866, Joan Batlló formed a partnership with his brothers under the name of "Batlló Germans". They created an earlier factory also called Can Batlló on Urgell street, in the Eixample of Barcelona. Two of the four founder brothers, Domènec and Jacint, died in 1866. Feliu, the oldest one, retired in 1876 and added his sons to the enterprise. Joan Batlló opted for dissolving the partnership and leaving the factory on Urgell street in the hands of Feliu's sons: Frederic, Enric, Àngel, Pia, and Dolors Batlló i Batlló. They named this new partnership "Batlló i Batlló", which had many labour problems and lasted until 1889 when it was sold and became what is today the L'Escola Industrial.

Joan Batlló and his nephews Domènec and Romà Batlló i Sunyol (sons of Joan's brother Domènec, who died in 1866) created the factory in La Bordeta. Joan had much experience in products derived from cotton. He had travelled all around the world searching for innovation, new markets in South America, and raw materials in Asia, when Americans blocked exportations due to the American Civil War.

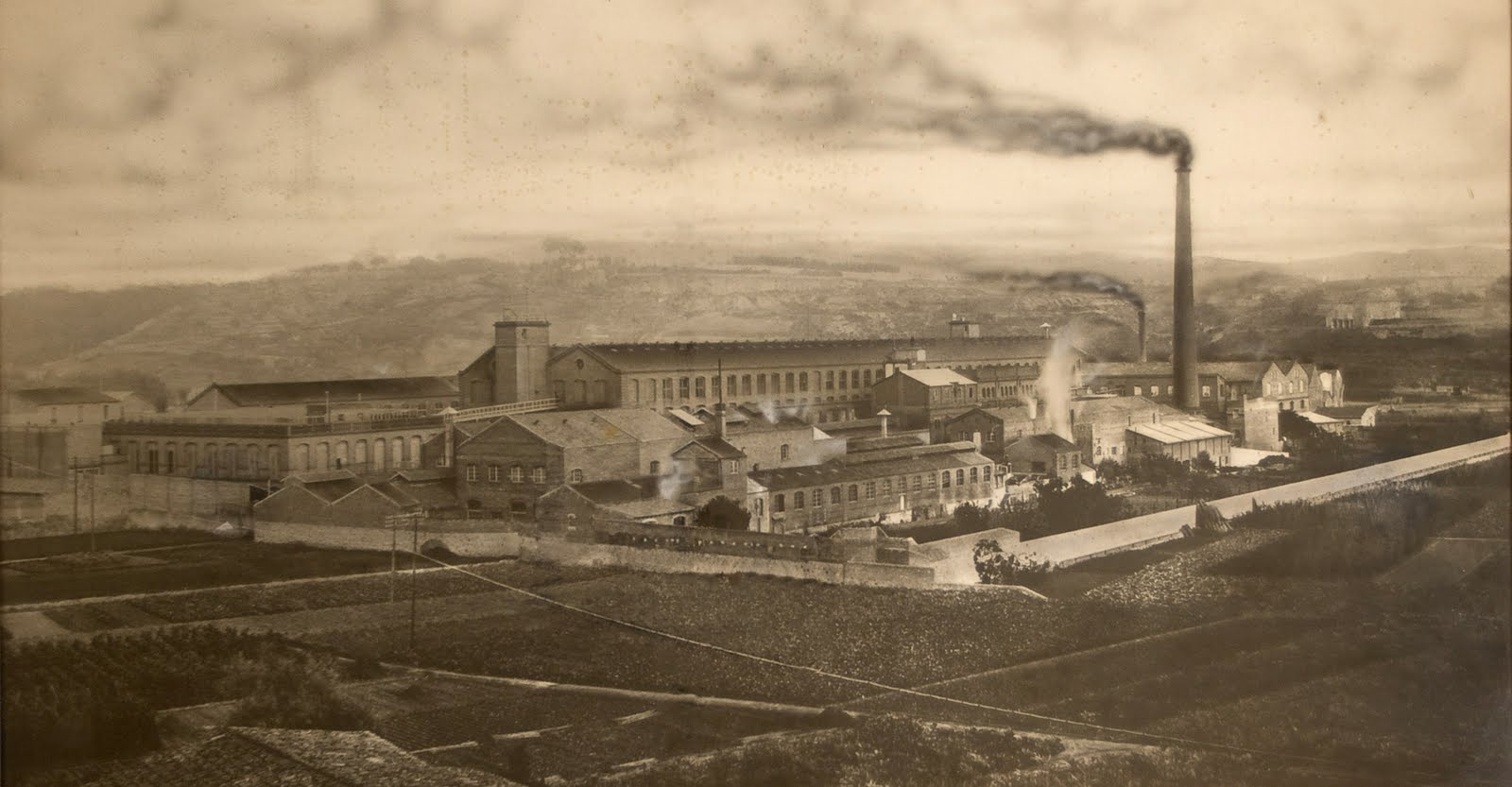
A view of the factory in Sants in the late 19th century

Sants was one of the main working-class neighbourhoods regarding textile industry. In this field, Can Batlló joined other textile businesses like Vapor Vell, Vapor Nou and Serra i Balet factories. A new sense of identity emerged in the La Bordeta neighbourhood.

The factory had a surface of 19,000 m^{2} on a land sized 26,000 m^{2}. It was a one-floor plant and had 24,000 spindles and 722 looms. A steam engine developed by the Maquinista Terrestre i Marítima factory provided 600 horsepower.

They started producing the same kind of products as the older factory on Urgell street, with which it competed. But in 1883 they followed La España Industrial by introducing cloth printing. They participated in the 1888 Barcelona Universal Exposition where they were granted the silver medal for "the perfection and competitive price of their white fabrics". The new Can Batlló employed 950 workers and had a more stable activity than its competition owned by "Batlló i Batlló".

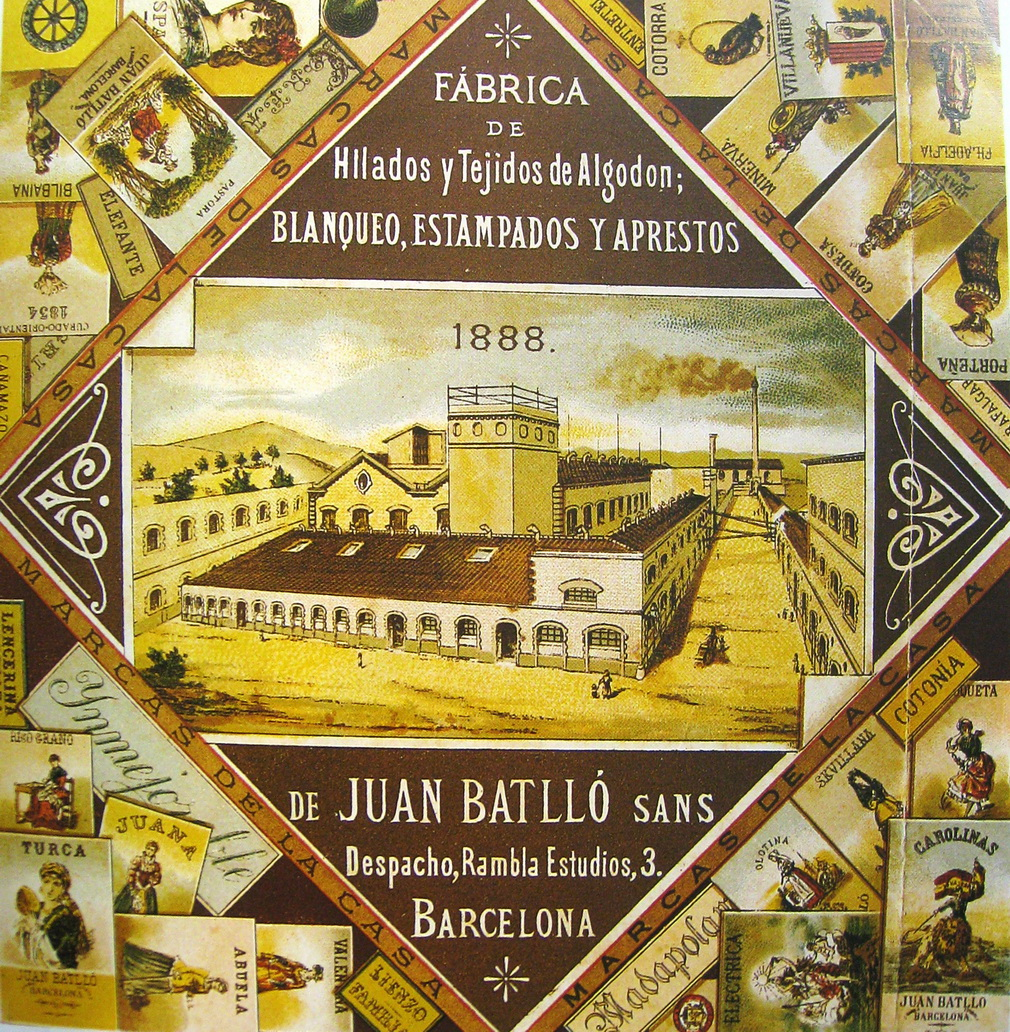
Advertising of "Joan Batlló" enterprise

In 1892 Joan Batlló i Barrera died, unmarried, and with no descendants. His nephews, Romà and Domènec Batlló i Sunyol continued the business under the name "Sobrinos de Juan Batlló". In 1898 they had already doubled the power of the factory to 1,200 horsepower, and increased capacity to on 32,000 spindles and 900 looms, and they had bought new machinery for the printing section. They also started manufacturing knitwear, a very original product for a traditional textile factory.

== The factory in the 20th century ==
In the Exposition Universelle in Paris (1900) the company was awarded the grand prize in the category "Threads and Cotton Fabrics". Unfortunately, the turn of the century saw a drop in the sewing activity, and consequently, a part of the workforce had to be fired, getting reduced to 800 workers. The First World War (1914-1918), however, contributed to its significant improvement. The factory became a public limited company in 1926 under the name "Nebots de Joan Batlló, SA", and opened its headquarters on Trafalgar street.

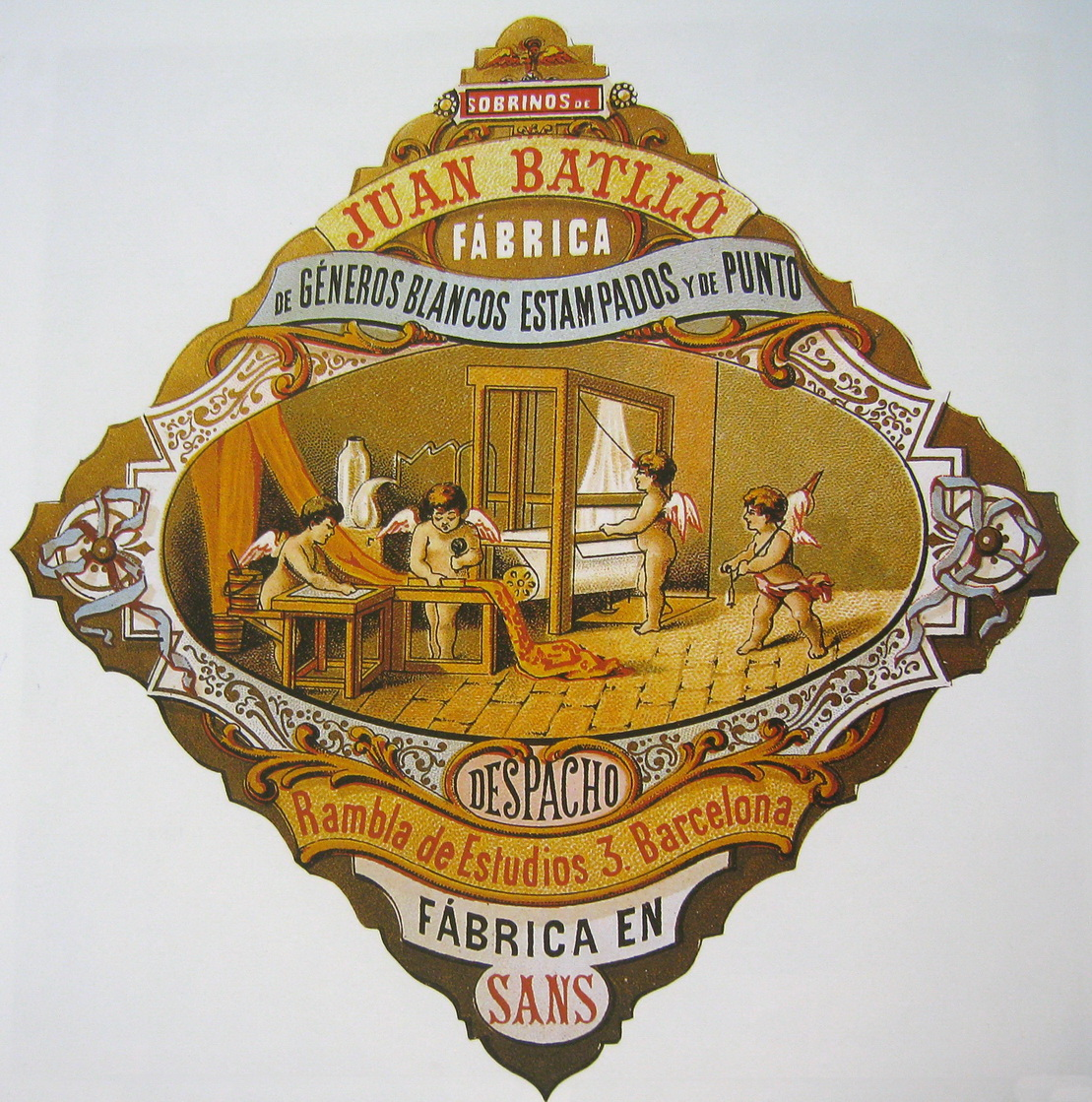
Advertising of the "Sobrinos de Joan Batlló" enterprise

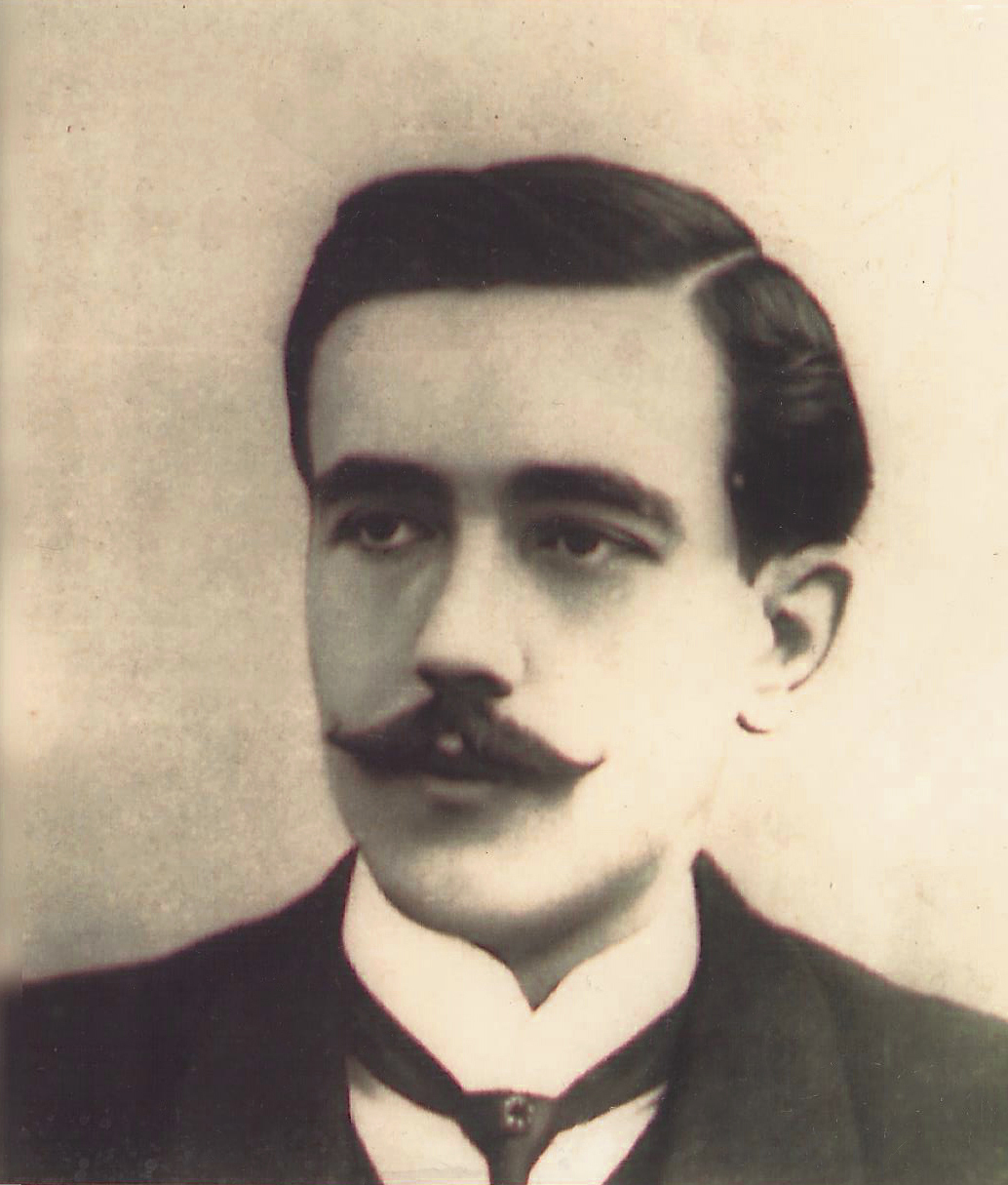
During the Spanish Civil War, Policarp Prats Montsalvatje, a mere employee, was responsible for running the factory and preserving it from the plunder.

Ten years later, the Civil War broke out in 1936, and the Batllós had to go into exile to France fearing for their lives. In such circumstances in which the control was missing and hundreds of workers were distressed about their uncertain subsistence, the employees themselves decided to drive forward the production and designate a temporary director. They all agreed to appoint mere employee Policarp Prats Montsalvatje (1884-1982) as the new director because of his honesty and courage. During those hard times and until the family owners returned, Prats Montsalvatje was responsible for running the factory and for preserving it from the plunder by the belligerent forces that were dominant at the time. Once the owners were back, he also returned to his former position as a labourer.

During the 1960s a crisis in the textile sector arose and Batlló's cotton company went bankrupt. It was then that the factory was taken over by Julio Muñoz Ramonet, one of the most convincing, imaginative, and audacious businessmen in Barcelona, who had a gift to cover any fraudulent business with a legal basis. Despite the speculation around the industrialist, who obtained his wealth at the expense of smuggling, the restructuring of the old textile fabric ended up evolving into a sort of an industrial ecosystem. It was an authentic city. The different trades, big and small ateliers, and also a bar that was the centre of any business discussion coexisted in harmony, tradition, and modernity.

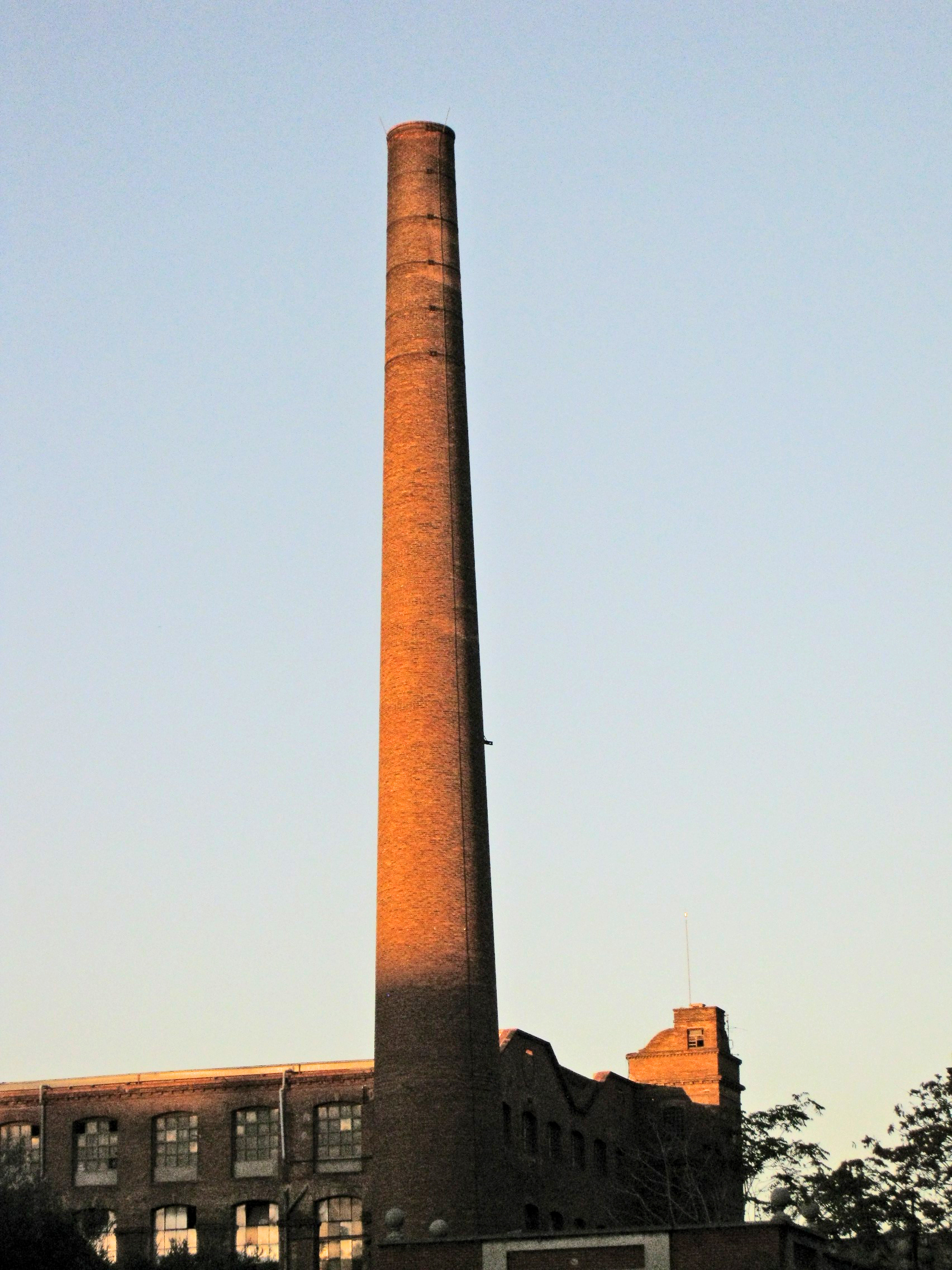
The chimney of the factory

Julio Muñoz Ramonet died in Switzerland and it was not until many years later that his corrupt businesses were uncovered by Spanish judge Baltasar Garzón. Supported by the Francoist autocratic regime, Ramonet managed to gather an extremely wide patrimony in Barcelona including two palaces: the Palau Robert and the Palau Montaner—where a collection of paintings of both Goya and El Greco were to be found—and the Ritz Hotel. The tug-of-war surrounding Can Batlló for the following years could simply be explained as a time when the industrial complex passed through several estate agents, but all belonging to the same person, Julio Muñoz Ramonet. Here there is a witty saying of deep significance among the elderly of that area: In Heaven leads God, but in La Bordeta, Muñoz. Still, Muñoz did not own the current requalified land in its entirety, but 80% of it.

=== The 1976 Requalification ===
After becoming an industrial estate comprising small and medium-sized businesses, in 1976 its 81.000 square metres were rezoned by the General Metropolitan Plan and dedicated to facilities and green areas.

=== The 2006 Urban Restructuring ===
In 2006, the Municipal Executive Committee of the Barcelona City Council approved the proposal for the urban restructuring of the Can Batlló industrial complex and the sector of La Magòria. This proposal kept the industrial buildings and created a 4.7-hectare park, 20 facilities, and more than a thousand houses, half of them protected. The last 200 small enterprises had to be moved to Seat's land in the free trade zone, which had been bought by the Free Trade Zone Consortium. However, the restructuring has not been performed yet and there are still some companies left.

== Nou Centre ==
The lands belong to Grup Gaudir, a multinational real estate company that has been working in Catalonia for several years, especially in both the Barcelonès and the Tarragonès counties. The company developed a project in order to remodel the old Can Batlló industrial estate, named Gaudir Nou Centre.

The Gaudir company considered the area available for building not to be sufficient in its first urban development plan and it filed a procedure under contentious-administrative jurisdiction against the City Council. As a consequence, the company obtained a proposal giving more land to the construction of housing, with a total of 1,377 houses and 21 facilities, one of which is the new headquarters of the Environment and Housing Office of the Government of Catalonia.

== Tic Tac Can Batlló ==
The "Can Batlló és per al Barri" Platform (Can Batlló is for the Neighbourhood) set 11 June 2011 as the date for the City Council to start the transformation process of the industrial estate so that it would be open to the neighbourhood. Within this context, the La Bordeta residents' committee and the Sants Social Centre, along with a number of neighbours, were willing to squat the lands if the process remained blocked. This situation led to some industrial plants called Bloc 11 being transferred in order to avoid their squatting. 11 June 2011, the neighbourhood was allowed access to the industrial plants and new spaces were created in the industrial buildings. By demolishing walls and industrial buildings as well as creating facilities and gardens, the evolution of the development process that will open the door to the neighbourhood keeps slowly moving forward.

== See also ==
- Batlló family
- Can Batlló (Eixample)
- Camí de la Cadena
- History of the cotton industry in Catalonia

== Bibliography ==
- Cabana, Francesc (1992). Fabricants i empresaris. Els protagonistes de la revolució industrial a Catalunya (in Catalan). Vol. 2. Barcelona: Enciclopèdia Catalana.
- de Riquer Llimargas, Borja (2001). Modernisme i modernistes. Vol. 1. Lunwerg. ISBN 978-84-7782-776-4.
- Suñol, Jerónimo. "Familia Batlló" (in Spanish).
