= Magòria-La Campana station =

Metro station in Barcelona, Spain

Magòria-La Campana
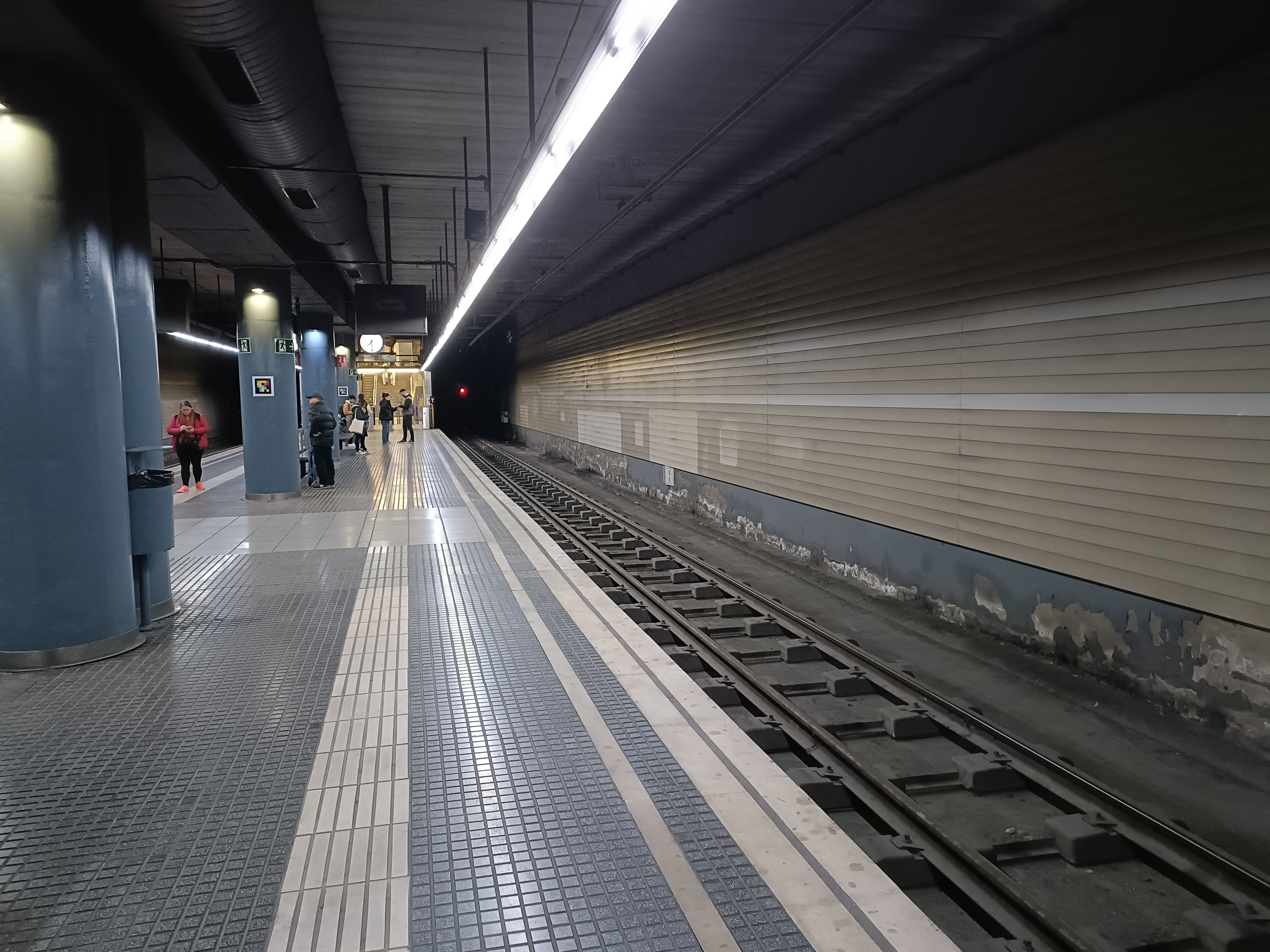
- View of the station's platform

General information
- Location: Barcelona (Sants-Montjuïc)
- Coordinates: 41°22′3″N 2°8′22″E
- System: FGC rapid transit station
- Owner: FGC
- Operator: FGC

Construction
- Structure type: Underground
- Accessible: Yes

Other information
- Fare zone: 1 (ATM)

History
- Opened: 17 July 1997 (Llobregat-Anoia Line)

Services
Preceding station	FGC	Following station
Ildefons Cerdà towards Molí Nou-Ciutat Cooperativa	L8	Barcelona Pl. Espanya Terminus
Ildefons Cerdà towards Can Ros	S33	Barcelona Pl. Espanya Terminus
Ildefons Cerdà towards Olesa de Montserrat	S4	Barcelona Pl. Espanya Terminus
Ildefons Cerdà towards Martorell Enllaç	S8	Barcelona Pl. Espanya Terminus
Ildefons Cerdà towards Manresa Baixador	R5	Barcelona Pl. Espanya Terminus
Ildefons Cerdà towards Igualada	R6	Barcelona Pl. Espanya Terminus
Location
- Location within Barcelona

Magòria-La Campana is a rapid transit station on the Llobregat-Anoia Line. Located in the Gran Via de les Corts Catalanes of Barcelona, it is served by the FGC-operated Line 8 of the Barcelona Metro and several suburban rail services of the Llobregat-Anoia Line.

The station was the original terminus of metre-gauge railway and was rebuilt as an underground station in 1997.

== Location ==
The station's underground platform is located under the Gran Via de les Corts Catalanes, close to the municipality of L'Hospitalet de Llobregat. It is physically located between the streets of Carrer de Mossèn Amadeu Oller and Carrer de la Mineria. The station features a single entrance hall with fare gates on the Espanya side of the platform. The former station building is close to the current station. It is also next to the former Can Batlló industrial complex and to the DGT headquarters for the province of Barcelona.

== History ==
Magòria originally opened in 1912 as the terminus of a metre-gauge railway line from Barcelona to Martorell, built and operated by the company Caminos de Hierro del Nordeste de España. Named after a former stream in the area, it included a modernist station building by Josep Domènech i Estapà. The station was a major hub for both passengers and freight.

In 1919, the line was taken over by the Companyia General dels Ferrocarrils Catalans and integrated into what today is the Llobregat-Anoia Line. As the line was extended to Espanya in 1926, Magòria was no longer a terminus and it became a dedicated freight station, with all passenger service moved to Espanya.

In 1974, the station was closed due to the decline of freight traffic on the line. After the line was taken over by Ferrocarrils de la Generalitat de Catalunya in 1979, a new underground tunnel was built in the Barcelona section of the line. The new underground station was opened close to the location of the former Magòria station on July 17, 1997. The new station's name included a reference to a historical name for the area, La Campana.

The former Magòria station building can still be found on the surface. It was renovated in 2006 and it currently hosts a civic center.

== Gallery ==
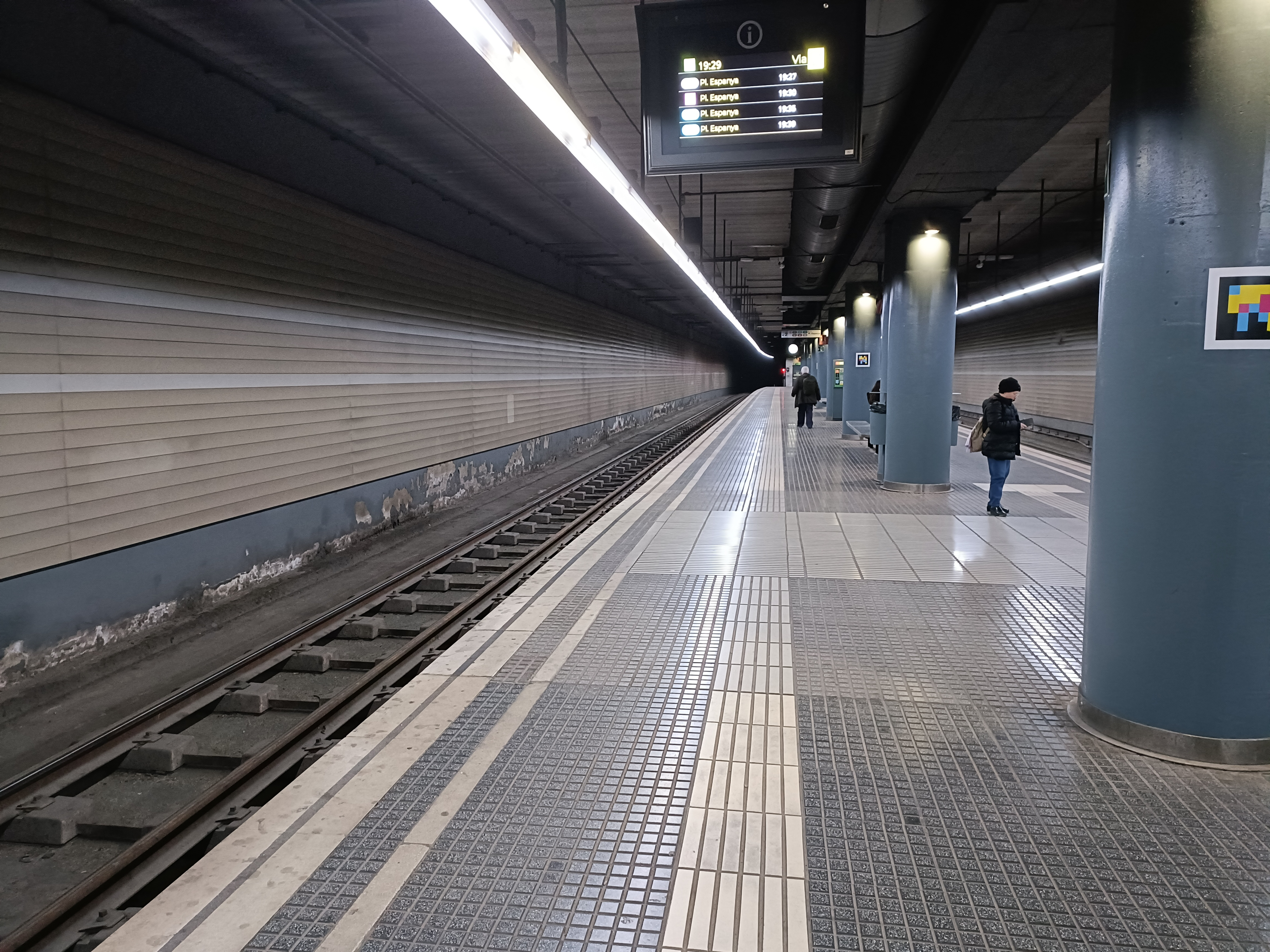
Another view of the station's platform

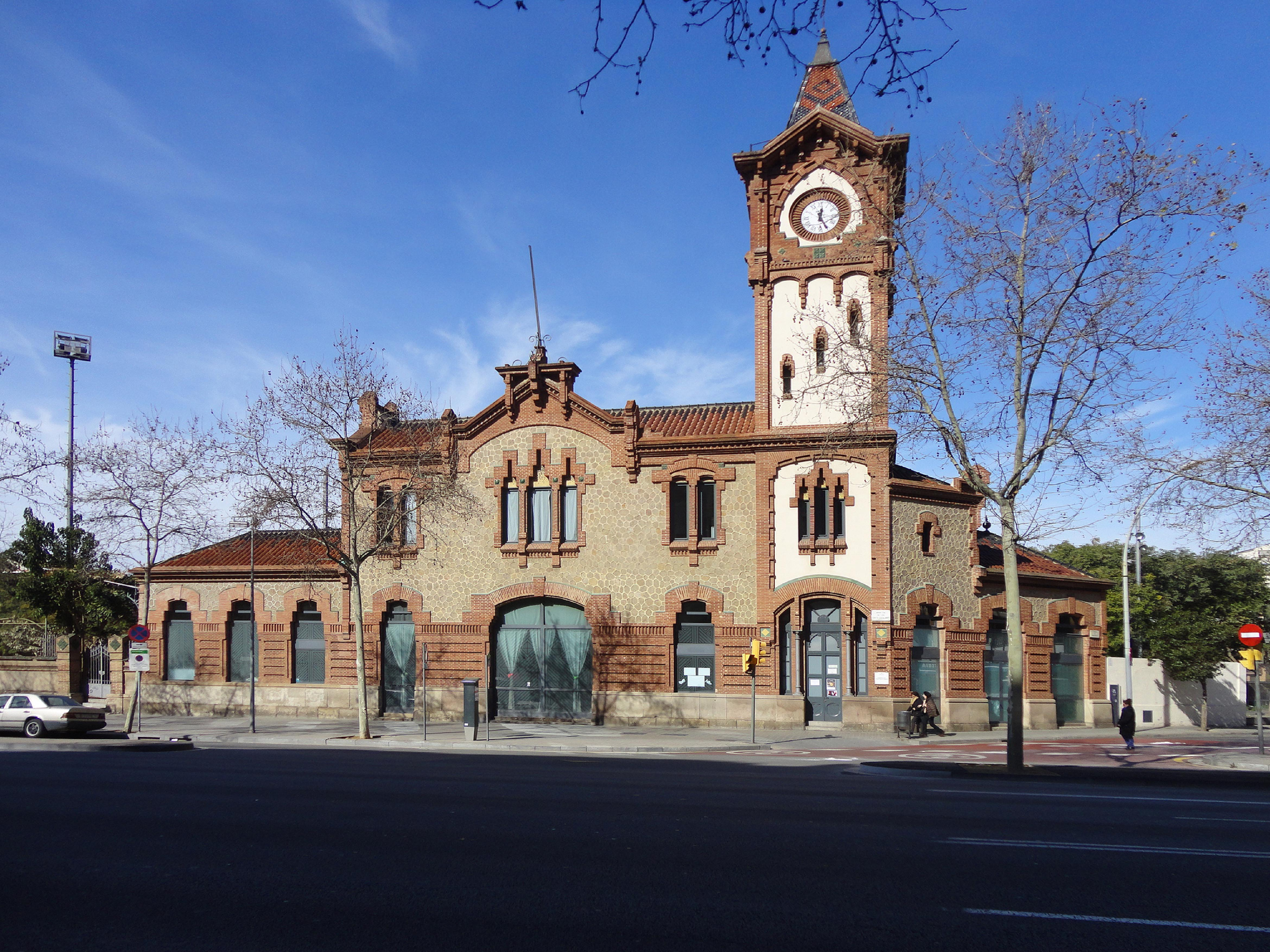
The old Magòria station building

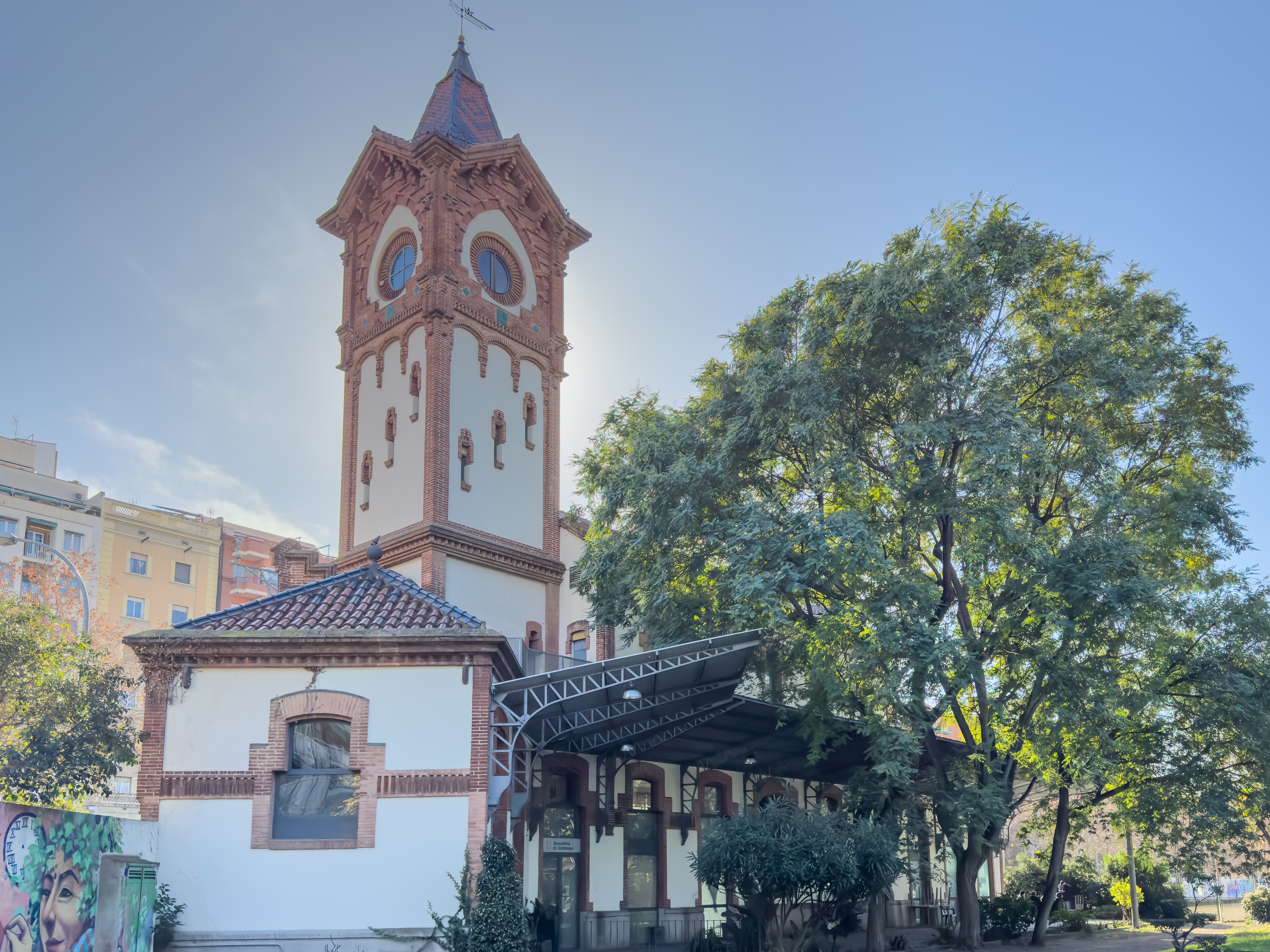
Another view of the station building

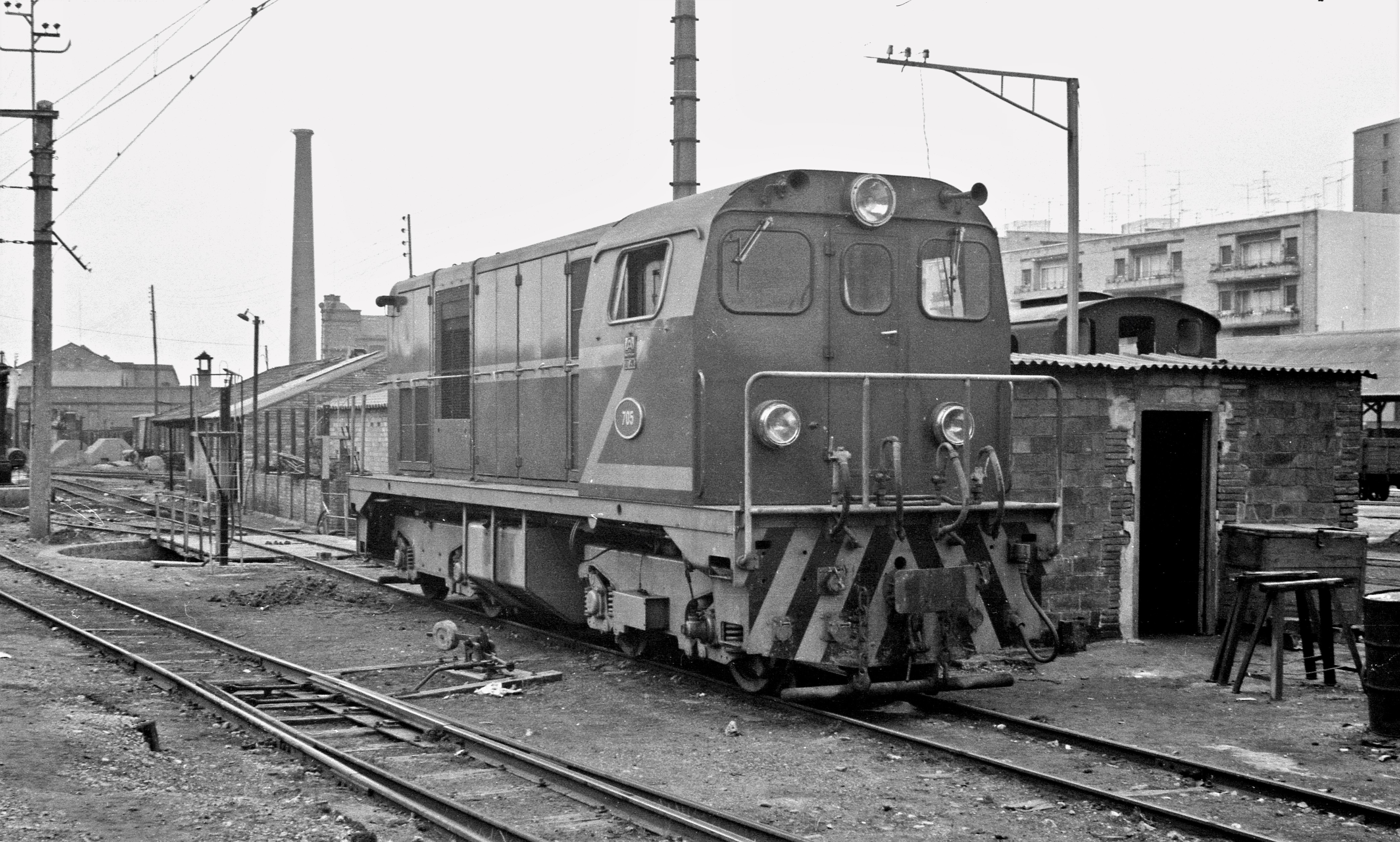
A diesel locomotive at the former Magòria station

Preceding station	FGC	Following station
Ildefons Cerdà towards Molí Nou-Ciutat Cooperativa	L8	Barcelona Pl. Espanya Terminus
Ildefons Cerdà towards Can Ros	S33	Barcelona Pl. Espanya Terminus
Ildefons Cerdà towards Olesa de Montserrat	S4	Barcelona Pl. Espanya Terminus
Ildefons Cerdà towards Martorell Enllaç	S8	Barcelona Pl. Espanya Terminus
Ildefons Cerdà towards Manresa Baixador	R5	Barcelona Pl. Espanya Terminus
Ildefons Cerdà towards Igualada	R6	Barcelona Pl. Espanya Terminus
