= Plaça d'Ildefons Cerdà, Barcelona =

Coordinates: 41.36455°N 2.135606°E

Plaça d'Ildefons Cerdà (often known simply as Plaça Cerdà) is a square in Barcelona, part of La Bordeta, in the Sants-Montjuïc district, very close to the boundary of the municipality of L'Hospitalet de Llobregat. It is named after the city's renowned urban planner Ildefons Cerdà. It is essentially a large roundabout which connects different parts of the city. The new courts of Barcelona and L'Hospitalet de Llobregat, collectively known under the name Ciutat de la Justícia are located in the immediacy of this square. Recent redevelopment has changed the area's feel, as well as promotion of the different Fira de Barcelona venues, not far from the square. Decisions made by recent urbanists has been criticised as a place hostile to strollers and therefore quite different from the idea of Barcelona an urbanist like Ildefons Cerdà had. A monument to Cerdà by sculptor Antoni Riera Clavillé was inaugurated in 1959, one century after his original urban plan, but was removed shortly after General Jorge Vigón, the Francoist Minister of Public Works, dismissed it publicly. There is no name plate in the square, which makes it theoretically a nameless space.

It is crossed by Gran Via de les Corts Catalanes (which here also becomes the main road to El Prat Airport) and by Rambla de Badal, which changes name here, becoming Passeig de la Zona Franca.

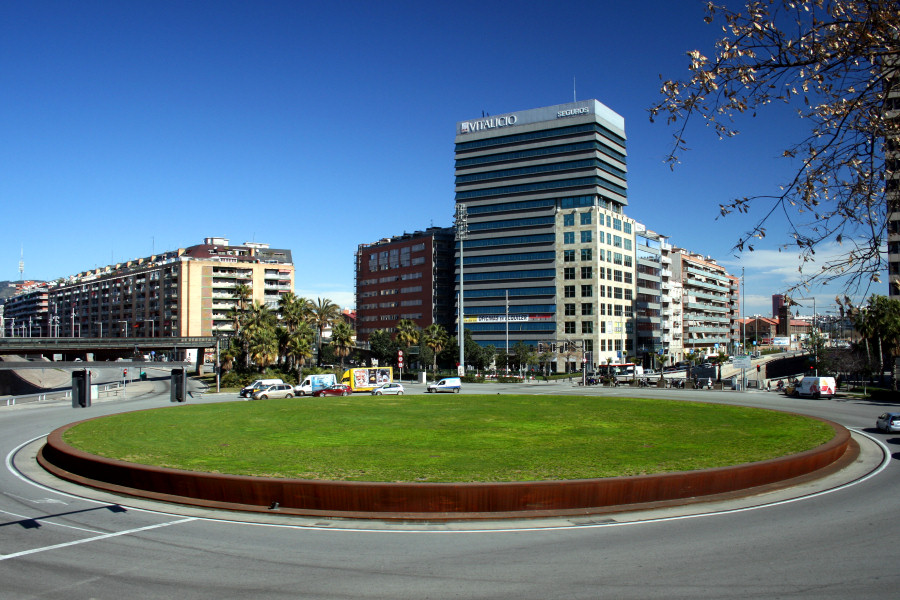
Plaça Cerdà - panoramio

== Transportation ==
The Ferrocarrils de la Generalitat de Catalunya commuter train and Barcelona Metro L8 station Ildefons Cerdà opened in 1987.
