= Plaça d'Espanya station =

Metro station in Barcelona, Spain

Espanya Barcelona-Pl. Espanya
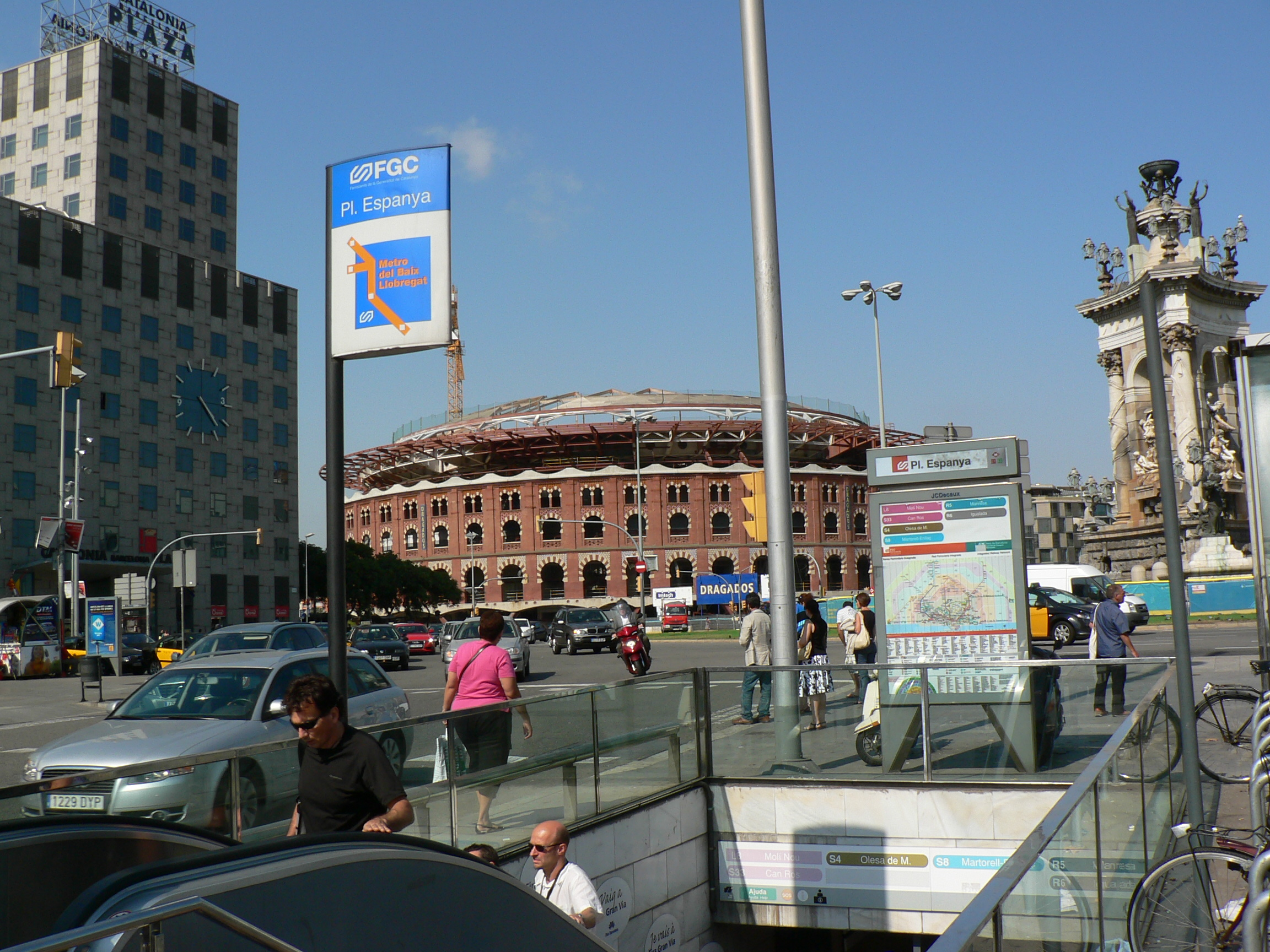
- The station's southern entrance from Gran Via de les Corts Catalanes in 2009.

General information
- Location: Plaça d'Espanya; Barcelona; Catalonia; Spain
- Coordinates: 41°22′29″N 2°8′57″E
- System: FGC rapid transit and commuter rail station Barcelona Metro rapid transit station
- Owner: Government of Catalonia
- Operator: Ferrocarrils de la Generalitat de Catalunya (FGC; Llobregat–Anoia Line); Transports Metropolitans de Barcelona (TMB; Barcelona Metro lines 1 and 3)
- Lines: Llobregat–Anoia Line; Barcelona Metro line 1; Barcelona Metro line 3
- Platforms: 2 side platforms and 1 island platform (Llobregat–Anoia Line); 2 side platforms (Barcelona Metro line 1); 2 side platforms (Barcelona Metro line 3)
- Tracks: 4 (Llobregat–Anoia Line); 2 (Barcelona Metro line 1); 2 (Barcelona Metro line 3)
- Connections: Urban and interurban buses; Bicing stations located nearby

Construction
- Structure type: Underground
- Cycle facilities: The upper hall of the Llobregat–Anoia Line station has a bicycle parking rack.
- Accessible: The FGC entrance (southwestern side of Plaça d'Espanya) is fully accessible.

Other information
- Station code: 122 (Barcelona Metro line 1); 321 (Barcelona Metro line 3)
- Fare zone: 1 (ATM Àrea de Barcelona)

History
- Opened: 1926; 100 years ago (Llobregat–Anoia Line and Barcelona Metro line 1); 1975; 51 years ago (Barcelona Metro line 3)

Passengers
- 2018: 5,405,512 (Llobregat–Anoia Line)

Services
Preceding station	FGC	Following station
Magòria-La Campana towards Molí Nou-Ciutat Cooperativa	L8	Terminus
Magòria-La Campana towards Can Ros	S33	Terminus
Magòria-La Campana towards Olesa de Montserrat	S4	Terminus
Magòria-La Campana towards Martorell Enllaç	S8	Terminus
Magòria-La Campana towards Manresa Baixador	R5	Terminus
Magòria-La Campana towards Igualada	R6	Terminus
Ildefons Cerdà towards Manresa Baixador	R50	Terminus
Ildefons Cerdà towards Igualada	R60	Terminus
Preceding station	Metro	Following station
Hostafrancs towards Hospital de Bellvitge	L1	Rocafort towards Fondo
Tarragona towards Zona Universitària	L3	Poble Sec towards Trinitat Nova
Location
- Location within Barcelona

Plaça d'Espanya (Catalan pronunciation: [əsˈpaɲə]), also simply known as Espanya, is an interchange complex underneath Plaça d'Espanya, in the Barcelona district of Sants-Montjuïc, in Catalonia, Spain. It comprises the Barcelona terminus of the Llobregat–Anoia Line and a Barcelona Metro station complex served by lines 1 (L1) and 3 (L3). On the L1, the station is between Hostafrancs and Rocafort, and on the L3 it is between Poble Sec and Tarragona. The Llobregat–Anoia Line station is served by Barcelona Metro line 8 (L8), Baix Llobregat Metro lines S33, S4 and S8, and commuter rail lines R5, R6, R50 and R60. The services on the Llobregat–Anoia Line (including the L8) are operated by Ferrocarrils de la Generalitat de Catalunya (FGC), whilst the L1 and L3 are operated by Transports Metropolitans de Barcelona (TMB).

== History ==
The station opened in 1926, when both the metro line L1 platforms, on the initial section of L1 between Bordeta and Catalunya stations, and the upper level FGC platforms opened. In 1929 the station served the 1929 Barcelona International Exposition held nearby.

The metro line L3 platforms were added in 1975, on the then separate line L3b between Paral·lel and Sants stations. The platforms became served by the L3 proper in 1982, when the L3 and L3b were merged into a single through service.

In 1997, two lower-level platforms were added to the FGC part of the station, aligned in anticipation of future eastern extension of the FGC lines.

== Station layout ==
The station complex comprises three sets of platforms, serving three different sets of lines on three different track gauges. All three sets of platforms are connected by pedestrian subways to each other, and to various street entrances in the square and its surrounding streets. The sets of platforms are:

- The Llobregat–Anoia Line uses four metre gauge terminal tracks located under Gran Via de les Corts Catalanes at its intersection with Plaça Espanya. The four tracks are at two different levels. The tracks on the upper level are served by a pair of 159-metre-long (522 ft) side platforms, whilst the tracks on the lower level are served by an island platform. The four terminal tracks converge, west of the station, into a single pair of tracks carrying all train services.
- Barcelona Metro line 1 (L1) uses a pair of through Iberian gauge tracks located directly below Plaça Espanya. These tracks are served by a pair of 92-metre-long (302 ft) side platforms. Previously, there had existed a third terminal track and platform, allowing trains from the city center to terminate at the station.
- Barcelona Metro line 3 (L3) uses a pair of through standard gauge tracks located beneath Paral·lel Avenue, between Plaça Espanya and Carrer Llançà. These tracks are served by a pair of 94-metre-long (308 ft) side platforms.

== Accesses ==
The interchange station has the following entrances:

- Carrer de Tarragona
- Avinguda Paral·lel
- Exposició (located in front of Fira de Barcelona's trade fair venue in Plaça d'Espanya)
- FGC (located in the southwestern side of Plaça d'Espanya)
- Carrer de la Creu Coberta

== Photo gallery ==
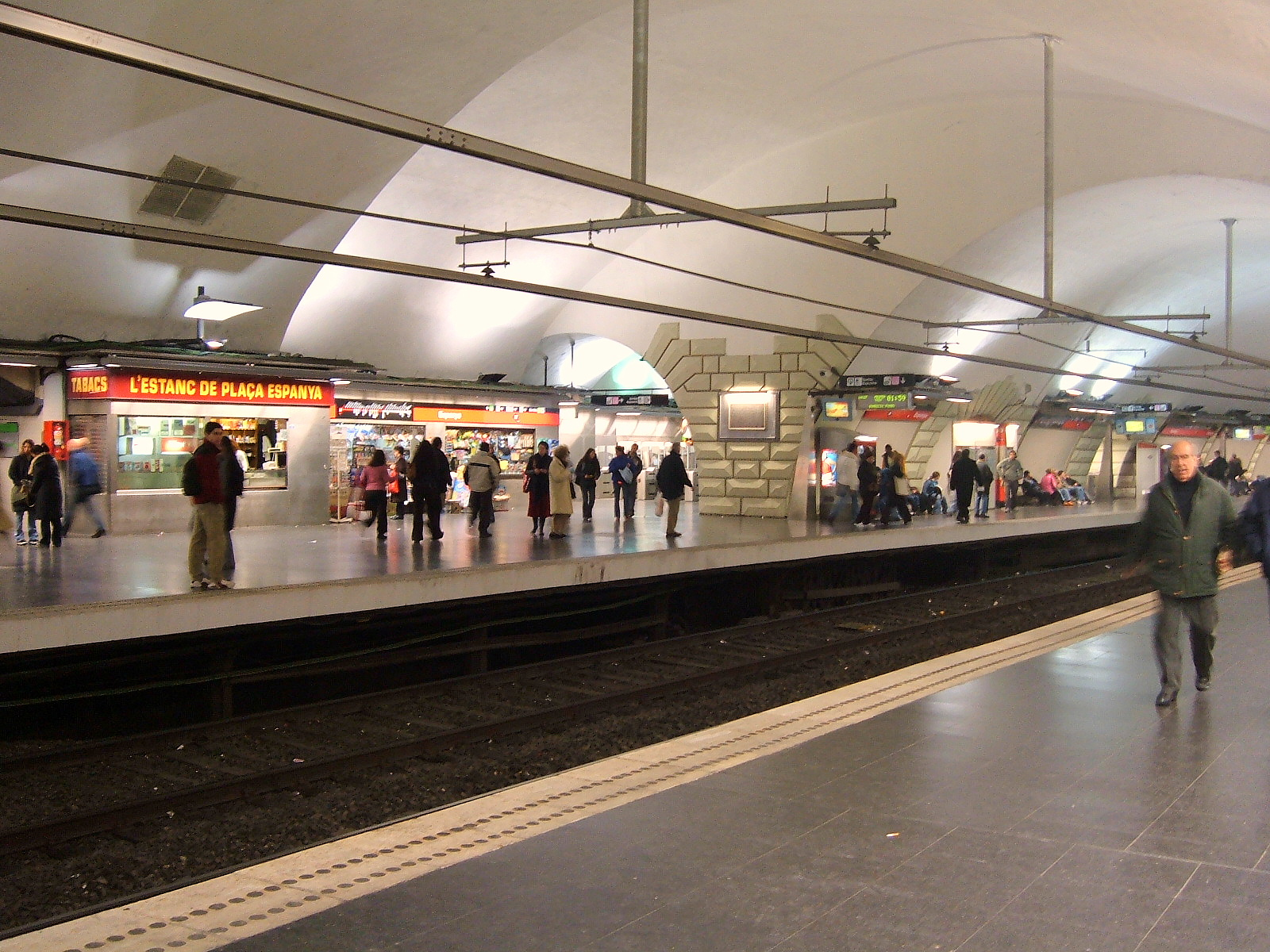
View of the platforms at the L1 station.

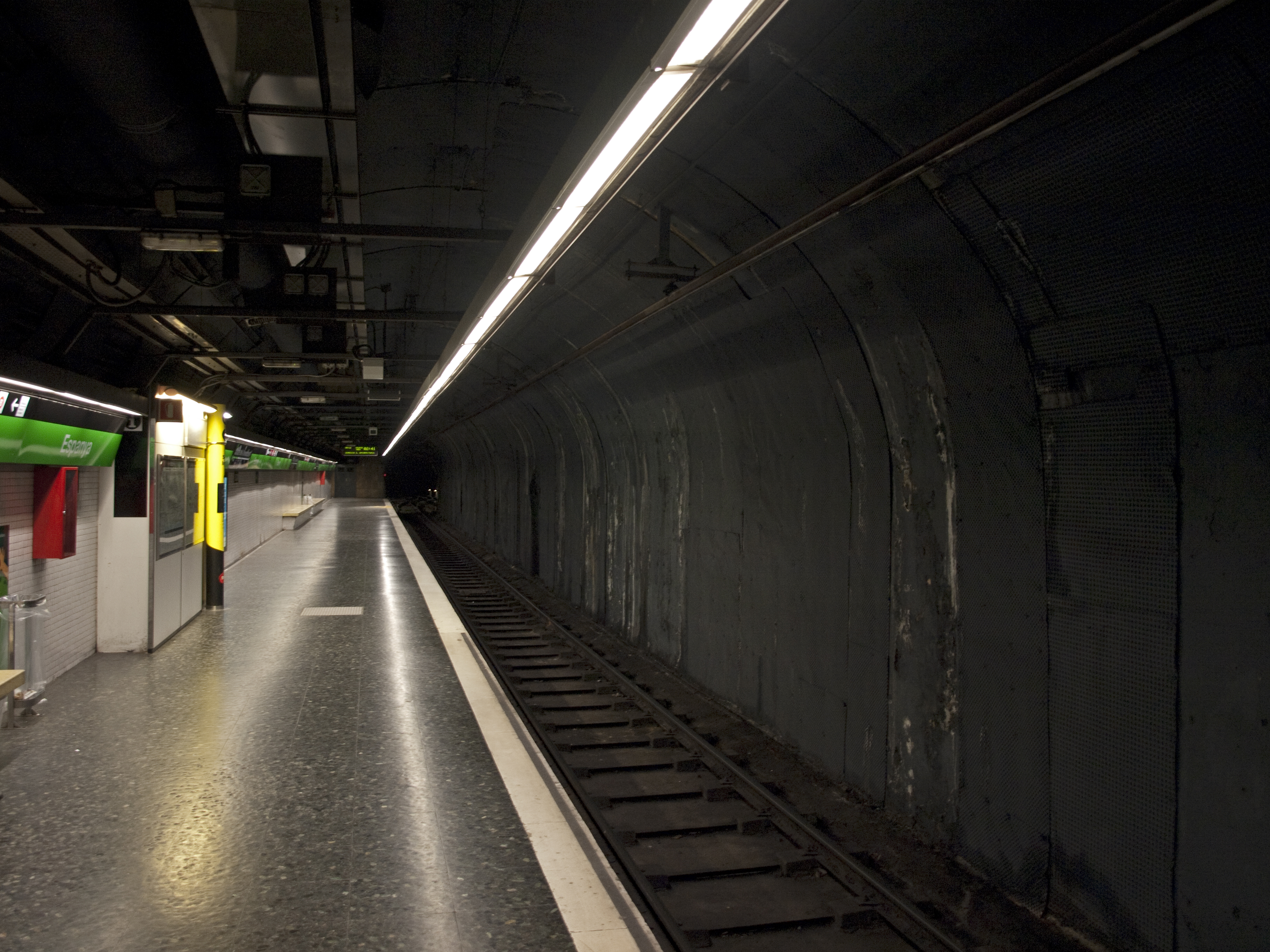
One of the platforms of the L3 station.

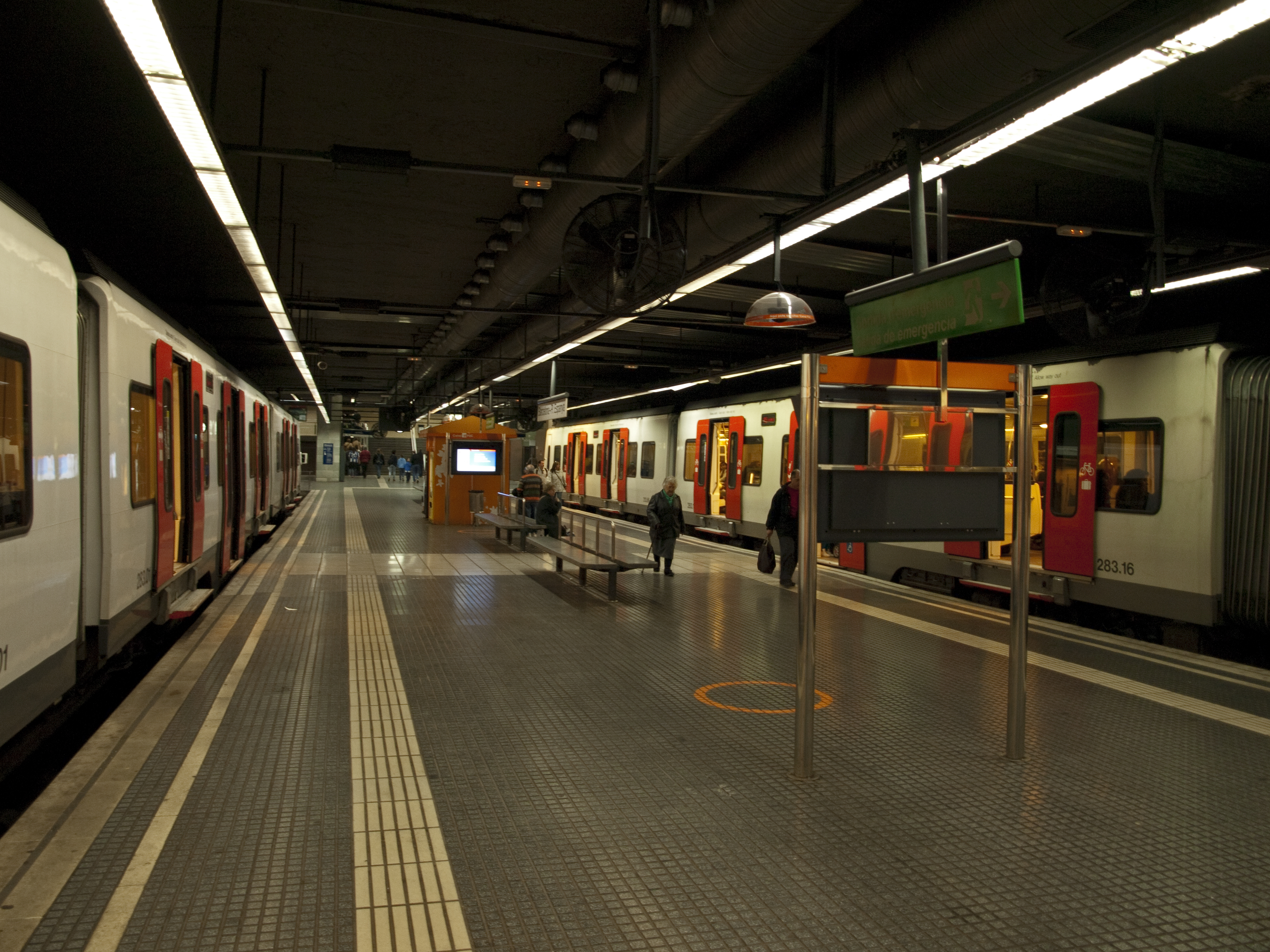
The lower-level platform of the Llobregat–Anoia Line station.
