= Ildefons Cerdà station =

Metro station in Barcelona, Spain

Ildefons Cerdà and Ciutat de la Justícia
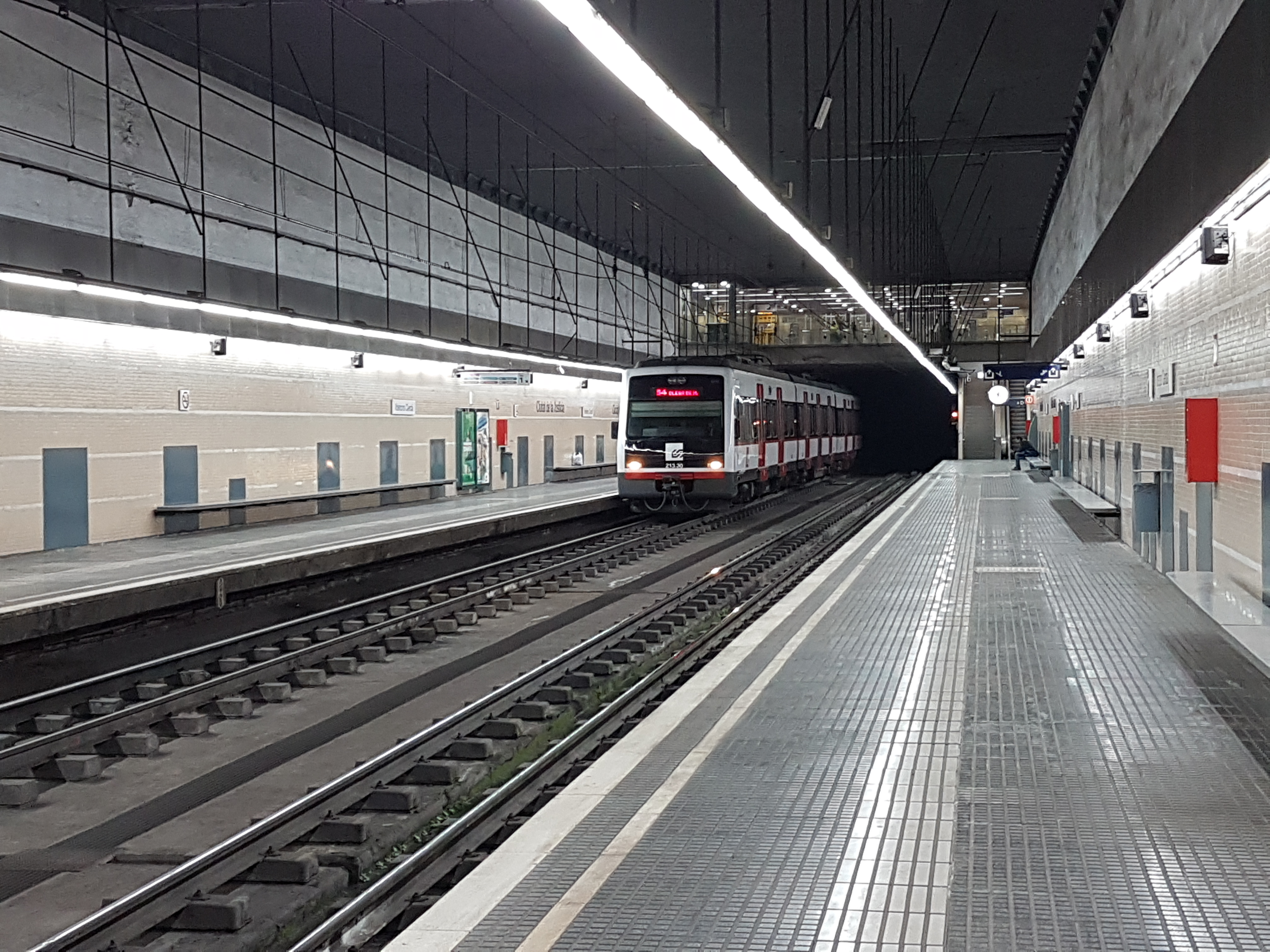
- A 213 series train entering Ildefons Cerdà

General information
- Location: L'Hospitalet de Llobregat
- Coordinates: 41°21′39″N 2°07′49″E
- System: FGC rapid transit station Barcelona Metro rapid transit station
- Owner: TMB and FGC
- Operator: TMB and FGC

Construction
- Structure type: Underground
- Accessible: Yes

Other information
- Fare zone: 1 (ATM)

History
- Opened: 2 March 1987 (Llobregat-Anoia Line); 23 November 2019 (Line 10)

Services
Preceding station	FGC	Following station
Europa | Fira towards Molí Nou-Ciutat Cooperativa	L8	Magòria-La Campana towards Barcelona Pl. Espanya
Europa | Fira towards Can Ros	S33	Magòria-La Campana towards Barcelona Pl. Espanya
Europa | Fira towards Olesa de Montserrat	S4	Magòria-La Campana towards Barcelona Pl. Espanya
Europa | Fira towards Martorell Enllaç	S8	Magòria-La Campana towards Barcelona Pl. Espanya
Europa | Fira towards Manresa Baixador	R5	Magòria-La Campana towards Barcelona Pl. Espanya
Europa | Fira towards Igualada	R6	Magòria-La Campana towards Barcelona Pl. Espanya
Europa | Fira towards Manresa Baixador	R50	Barcelona Pl. Espanya Terminus
Europa | Fira towards Igualada	R60	Barcelona Pl. Espanya Terminus
Preceding station	Metro	Following station
Foneria towards ZAL | Riu Vell	L10 Sud	Provençana towards Collblanc
Location

Ildefons Cerdà (Catalan pronunciation: [ildəˈfons səɾˈða]) and Ciutat de la Justícia (Catalan pronunciation: [siwˈtad də lə ʒusˈtisi.ə]) are two closely located rapid transit stations that serve as an interchange of the Barcelona Metro and the FGC commuter lines. The stations are located on the Gran Via de les Corts Catalanes at its intersection with the city limits of Barcelona and L'Hospitalet de Llobregat.

Ildefons Cerdà is served by the FGC-operated Line 8 of the Barcelona Metro and the suburban rail lines of the Llobregat-Anoia Line while Ciutat de la Justícia is served by the TMB-operated Line 10 of the Barcelona Metro network.

Both underground stations are located in Hospitalet de Llobregat beneath the Gran Via de les Corts Catalanes and close to the Plaça d'Ildefons Cerdà, just outside the limits of the Barcelona municipality.

== Location ==
The stations' two sets of platforms, separated by about 200 meters, are both located under the Gran Via de les Corts Catalanes in the municipality of L'Hospitalet de Llobregat. Unlike other Barcelona Metro interchange stations, there is no direct connection and passengers have to transfer between lines on the street.

=== Ildefons Cerdà ===
The FGC station is physically located between the streets of Carrer de l'Alhambra and Carrer Modern. The station features a single entrance hall with fare gates on the Espanya side of the platforms, with two accesses on the Gran Via.

=== Ciutat de la Justícia ===
The Line 10 platforms are located beneath the intersection between Carrer de Victoria Kent and the Gran Via. A long entrance hall connects the two accesses on the Gran Via, on each side of the Ciutat de la Justícia buildings.

== History ==
=== Ildefons Cerdà ===
The station is named after the nearby Plaça d'Ildefons Cerdà, at the border between the Barcelona and Hospitalet city limits. It entered operation on March 2, 1987, with the inauguration of the new underground layout of the Llobregat-Anoia Line between the stations of Sant Josep and Espanya.

=== Ciutat de la Justícia ===
The station is named after the Ciutat de la Justícia complex, which it serves. It was inaugurated as an infill station on November 23, 2019. The southern branch of Line 10, on which the station is located, had already been in service since September 2018. As other stations on the Line 9/10 project, the station was built within the bored tunnel on two levels, with an upper and lower platform.

== Gallery ==
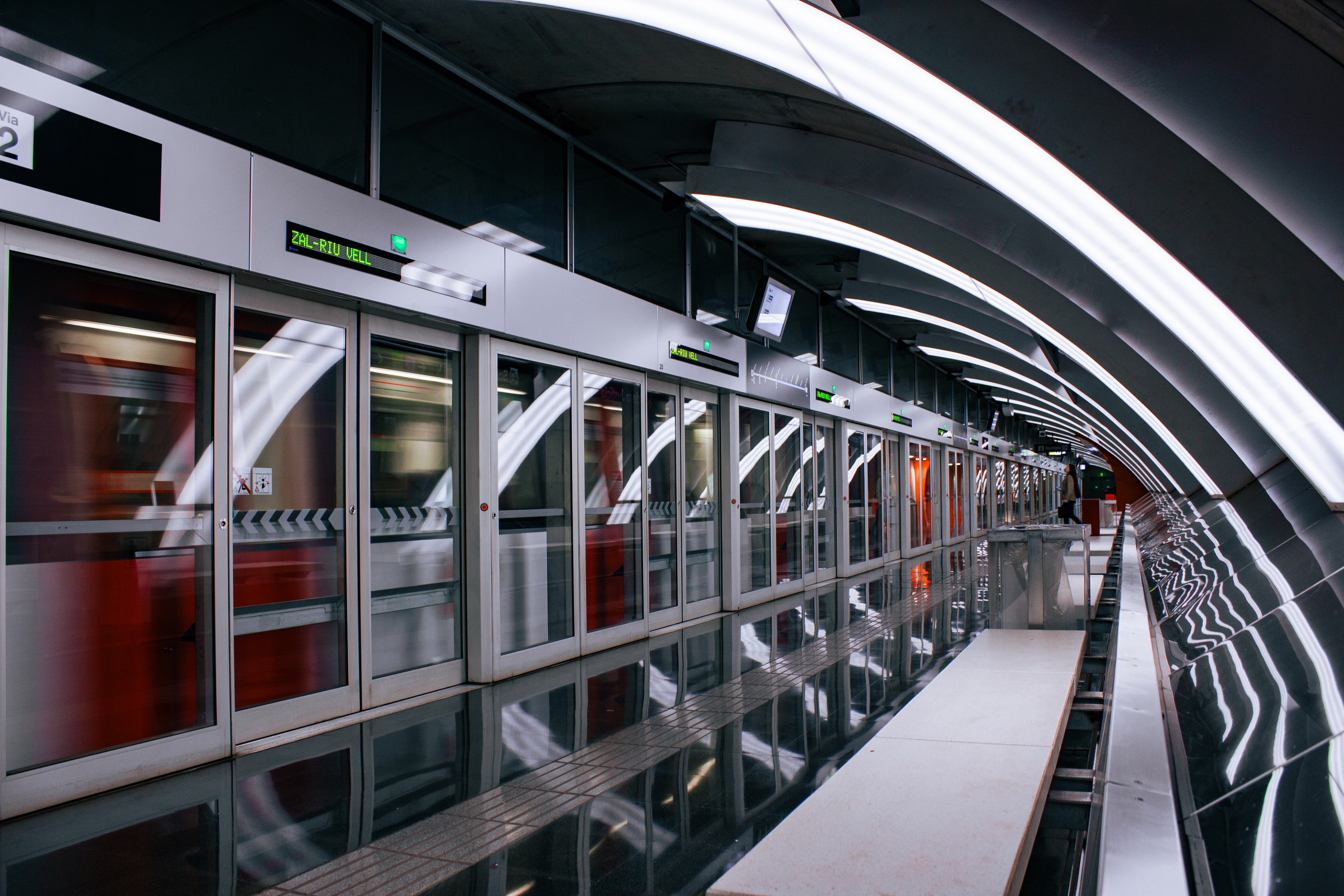
Upper platform at Ciutat de la Justícia

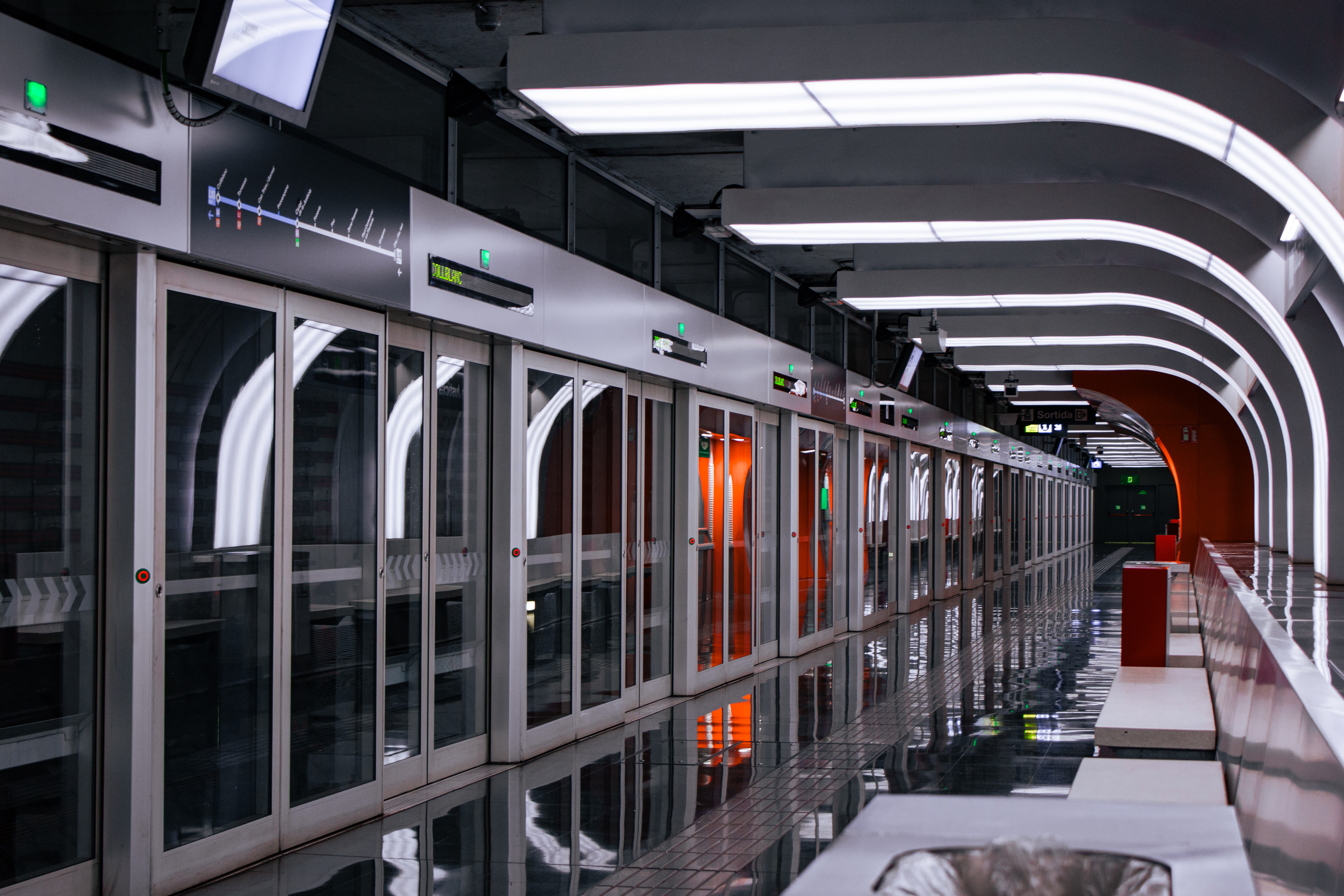
Lower platform at Ciutat de la Justícia

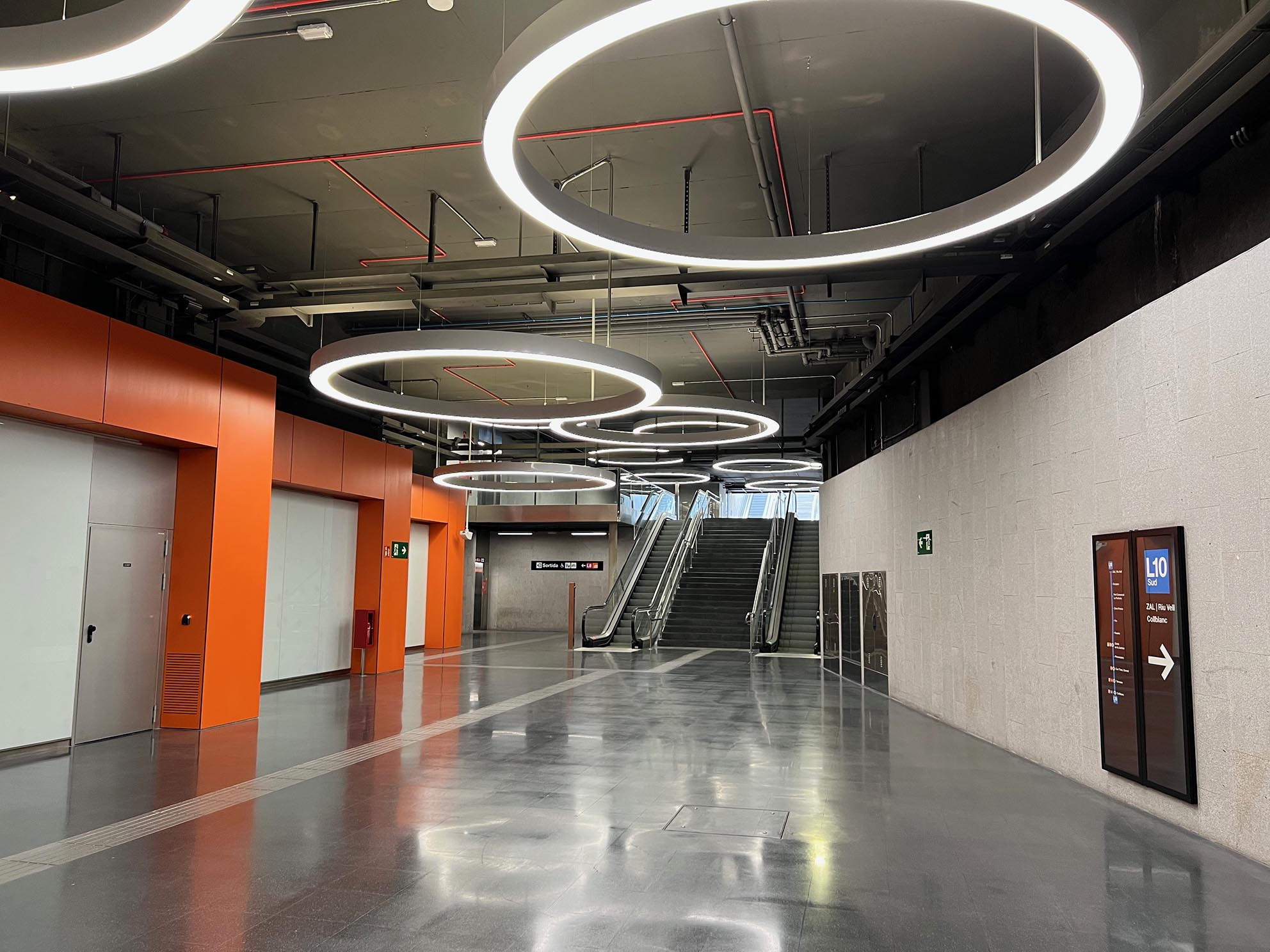
Entrance hall at Ciutat de la Justícia

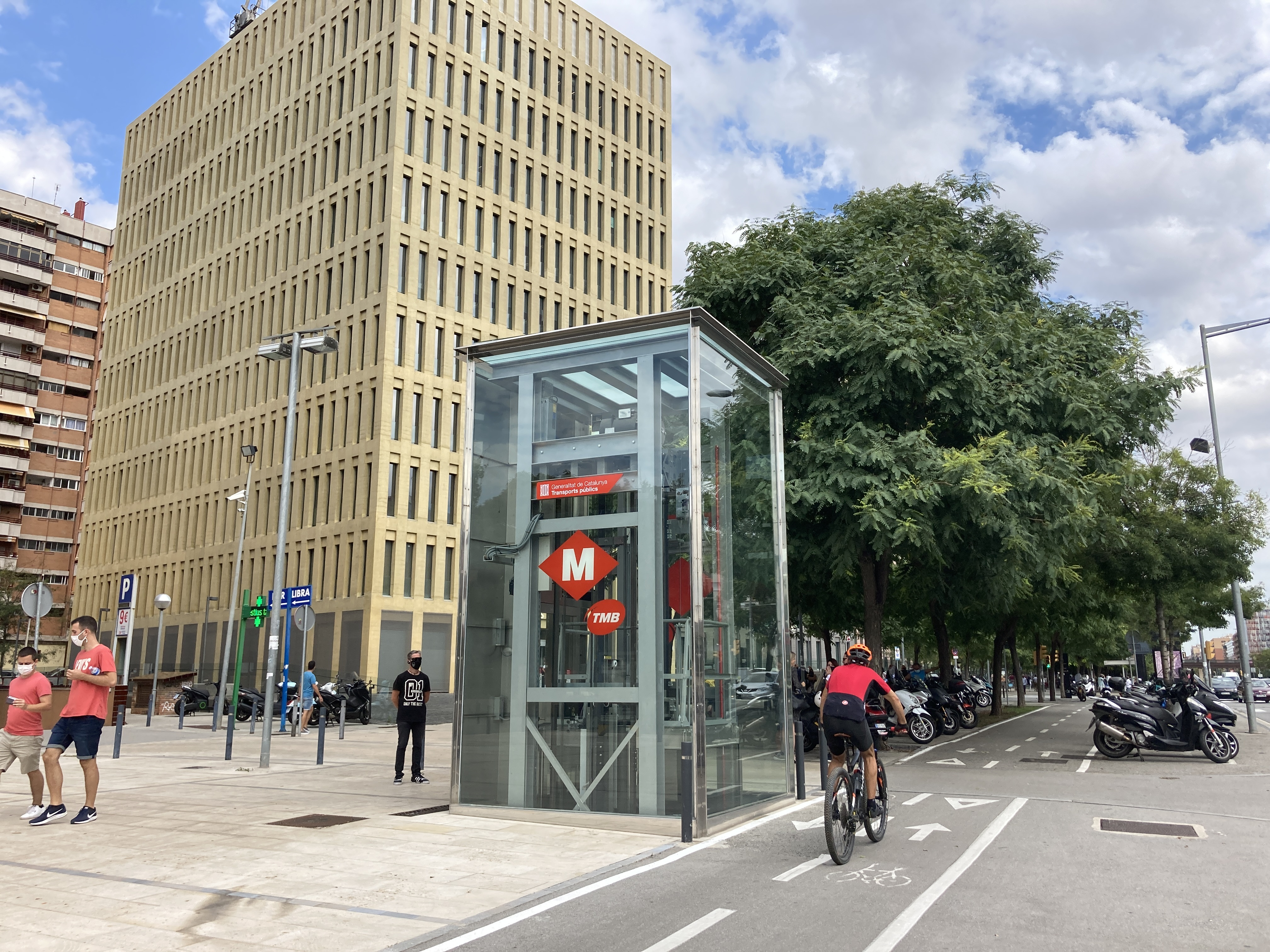
Access elevator to Ciutat de la Justícia

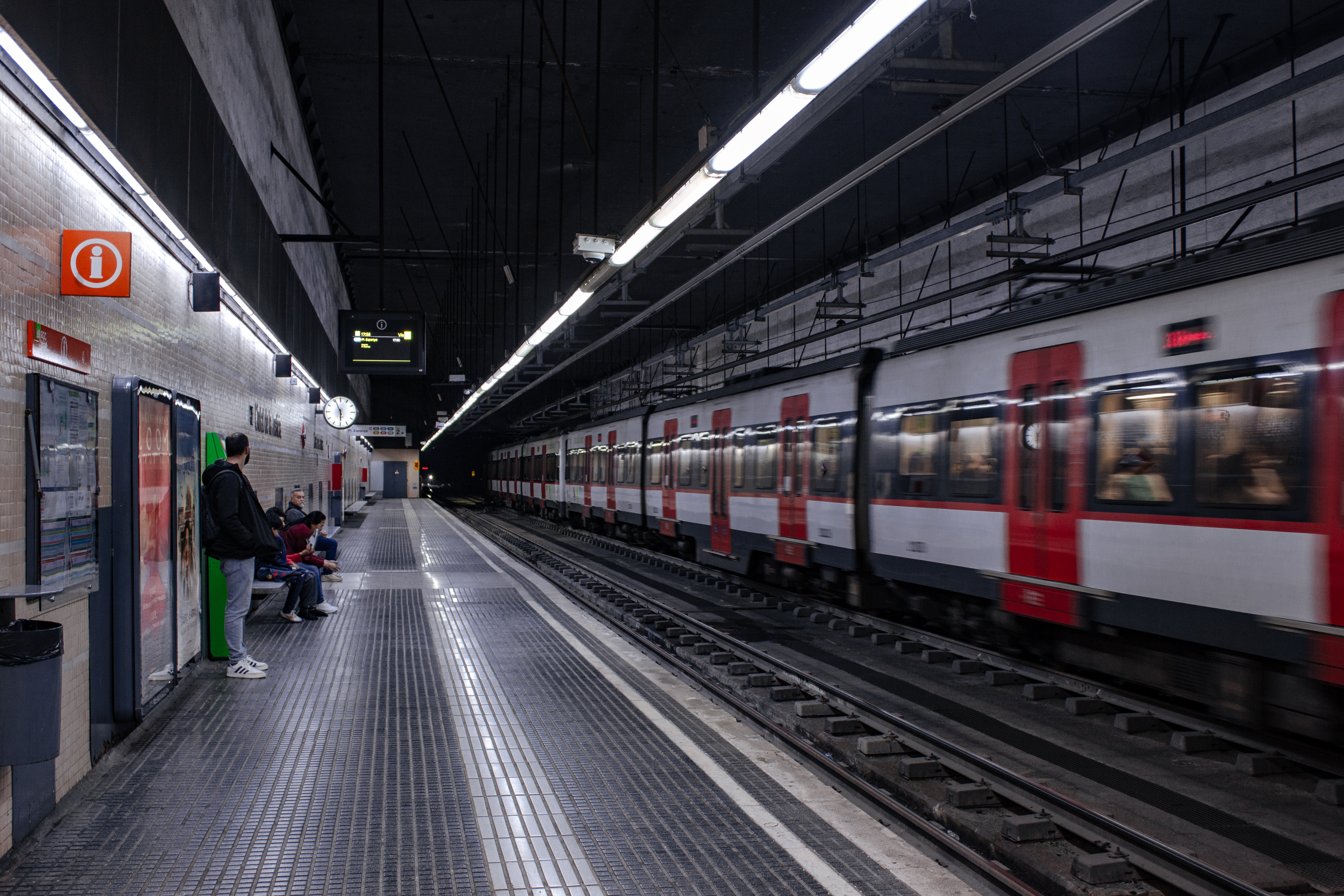
An FGC 213 Series train at Ildefons Cerdà

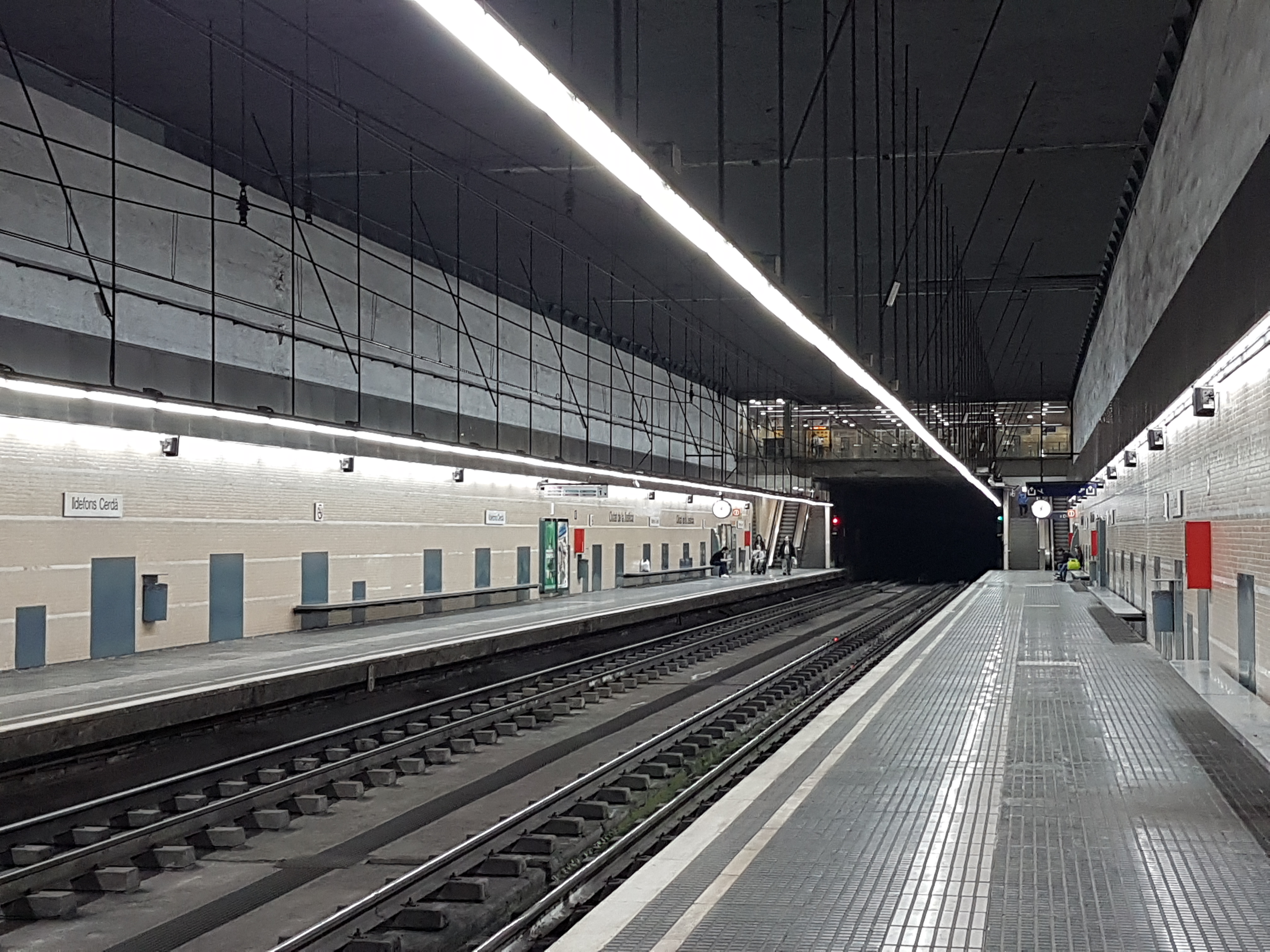
Platforms at Ildefons Cerdà

Preceding station	FGC	Following station
Europa | Fira towards Molí Nou-Ciutat Cooperativa	L8	Magòria-La Campana towards Barcelona Pl. Espanya
Europa | Fira towards Can Ros	S33	Magòria-La Campana towards Barcelona Pl. Espanya
Europa | Fira towards Olesa de Montserrat	S4	Magòria-La Campana towards Barcelona Pl. Espanya
Europa | Fira towards Martorell Enllaç	S8	Magòria-La Campana towards Barcelona Pl. Espanya
Europa | Fira towards Manresa Baixador	R5	Magòria-La Campana towards Barcelona Pl. Espanya
Europa | Fira towards Igualada	R6	Magòria-La Campana towards Barcelona Pl. Espanya
Europa | Fira towards Manresa Baixador	R50	Barcelona Pl. Espanya Terminus
Europa | Fira towards Igualada	R60	Barcelona Pl. Espanya Terminus
Preceding station	Metro	Following station
Foneria towards ZAL | Riu Vell	L10 Sud	Provençana towards Collblanc
