= Ciutat de la Justícia de Barcelona i l'Hospitalet de Llobregat =

Coordinates: 41°21′51″N 2°07′57″E

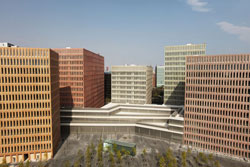
Ciutat de la Justícia.

The Ciutat de la Justícia de Barcelona i l'Hospitalet de Llobregat or just Ciutat de la Justícia (Catalan for City of Justice) is a recent architectural development in the Sants-Montjuïc district of Barcelona and its immediately adjacent suburb of l'Hospitalet de Llobregat, on Gran Via de les Corts Catalanes near Plaça d'Ildefons Cerdà and Plaça d'Europa. It hosts most of the legal departments of the metropolitan area, which were previously located in 17 separate buildings scattered around both cities. It does not include the whole of Barcelona's judicial administration, but shares it with the Palace of Justice of Barcelona, on Passeig de Lluís Companys. The 330,000 square metres it spans are distributed in eight buildings designed by David Chipperfield Architects and Fermín Vázquez. It was envisioned as part of the urban regeneration program for L'Hospitalet de Llobregat that has taken place over the decades of the 2000s and 2010s.

== Transport ==
The Ciutat de la Justícia area can be easily accessed via the Barcelona Metro and Ferrocarrils de la Generalitat de Catalunya station Ildefons Cerdà station - Ciutat de la Justícia. It includes metro lines L8 and L10 as well as suburban lines R5, R6, S33, S4 and S8.
