= La Bordeta (Barcelona) =

Coordinates: 41°22′13.78″N 2°8′13.55″E

- Neighborhood of Barcelona
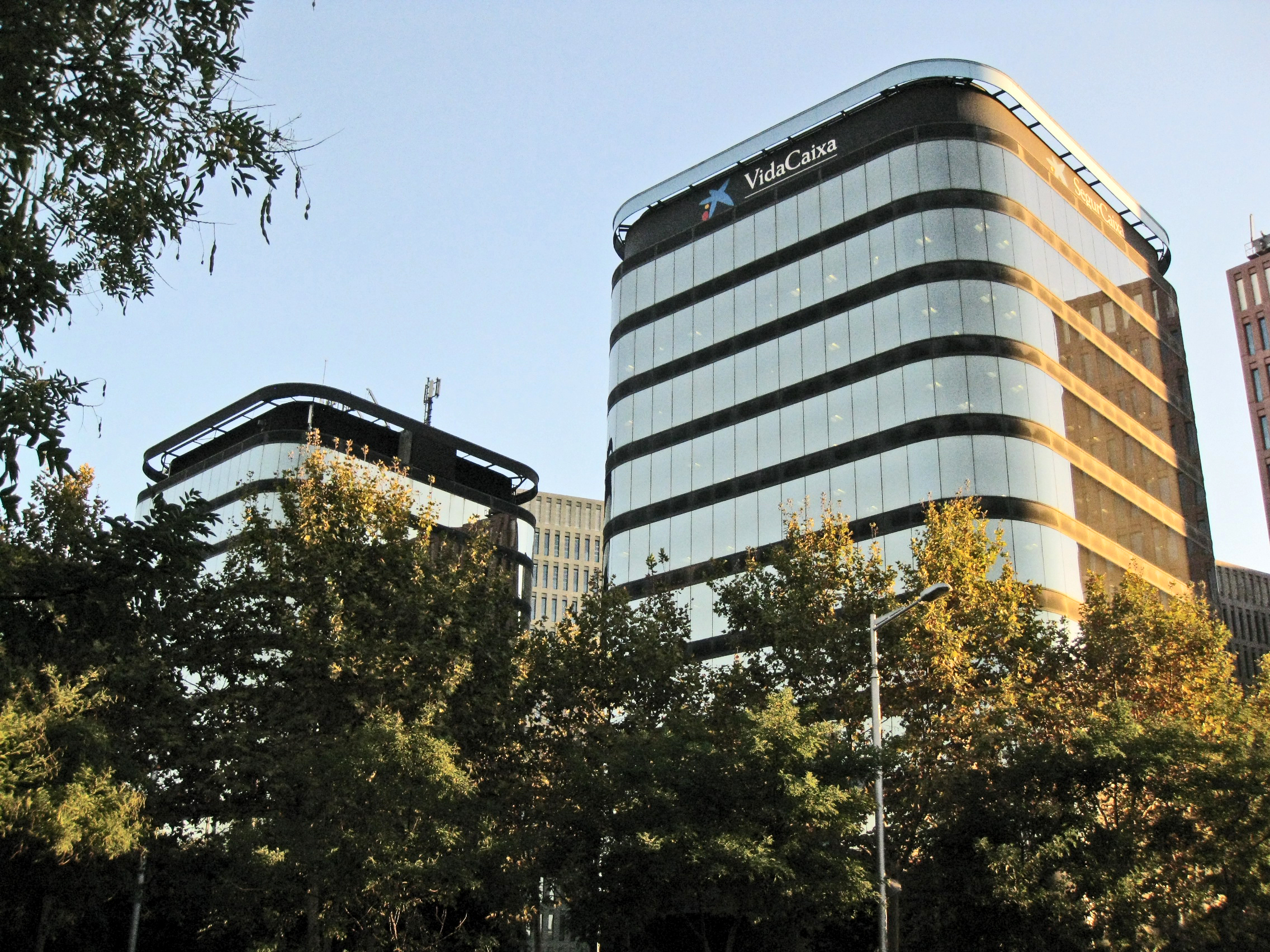
- Torres Cerdà, VidaCaixa, on Plaça Cerdà
- Interactive map of La Bordeta
- Country: Spain
- Autonomous community: Catalonia
- Province: Barcelona
- Comarca: Barcelonès
- Municipality: Barcelona
- District: Sants-Montjuïc

Area
  - Total: 0.577 km^{2} (0.223 sq mi)

Population
  - Total: 18,518
  - Density: 32,100/km^{2} (83,100/sq mi)

La Bordeta (Catalan pronunciation: [lə βurˈdɛtə], Spanish pronunciation: [la βoɾˈðeta]) is a neighbourhood in the Sants-Montjuïc district of Barcelona, Catalonia (Spain). It is located between Sants and l'Hospitalet de Llobregat. The neighbourhood was in the bottom of the former municipality of Sants.
