= Gran Via de les Corts Catalanes =

Thoroughfare in Barcelona, Catalonia, Spain

Coordinates: 41°23′20″N 2°10′16″E

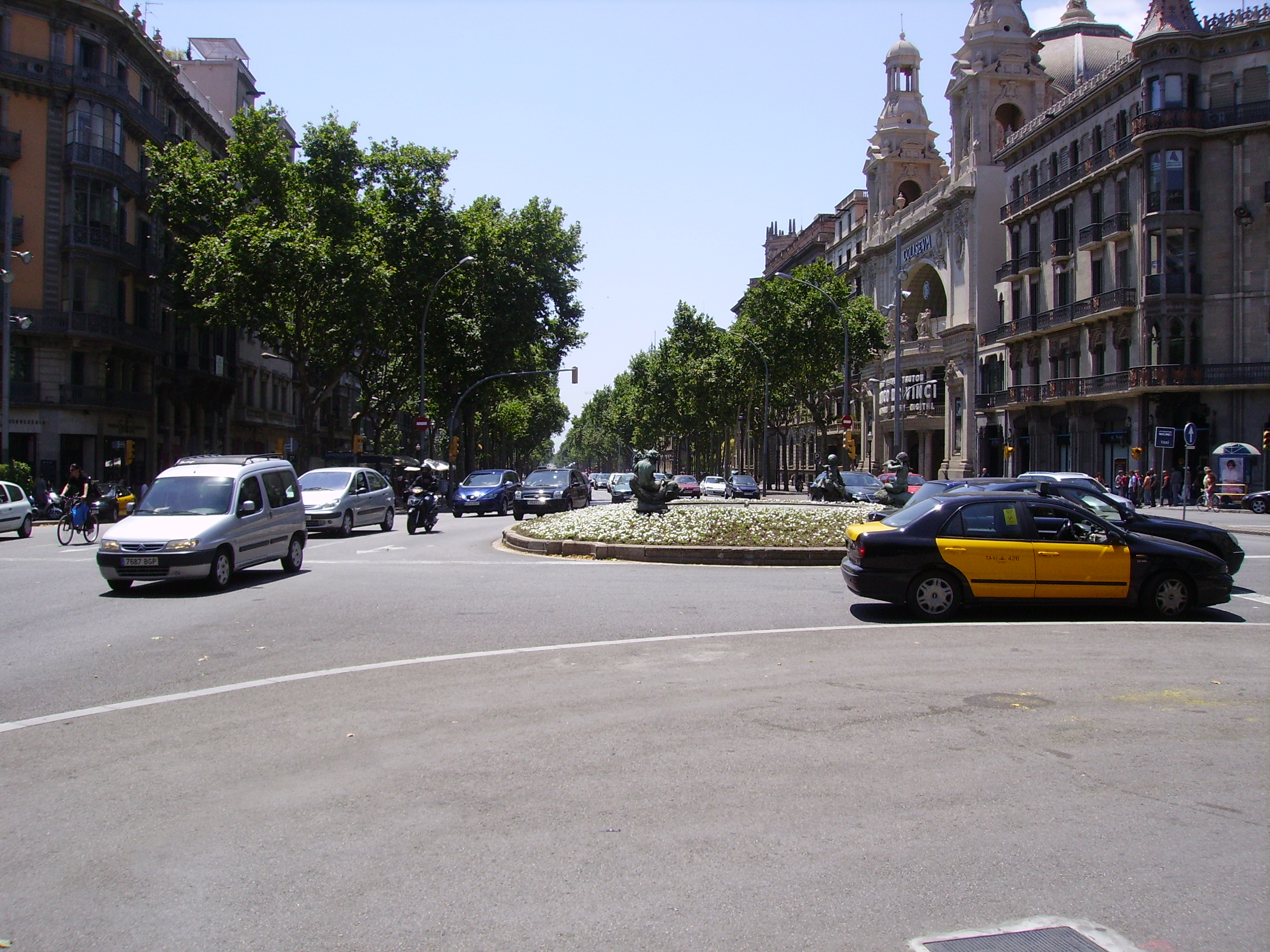
Crossing between Rambla de Catalunya and Gran Via

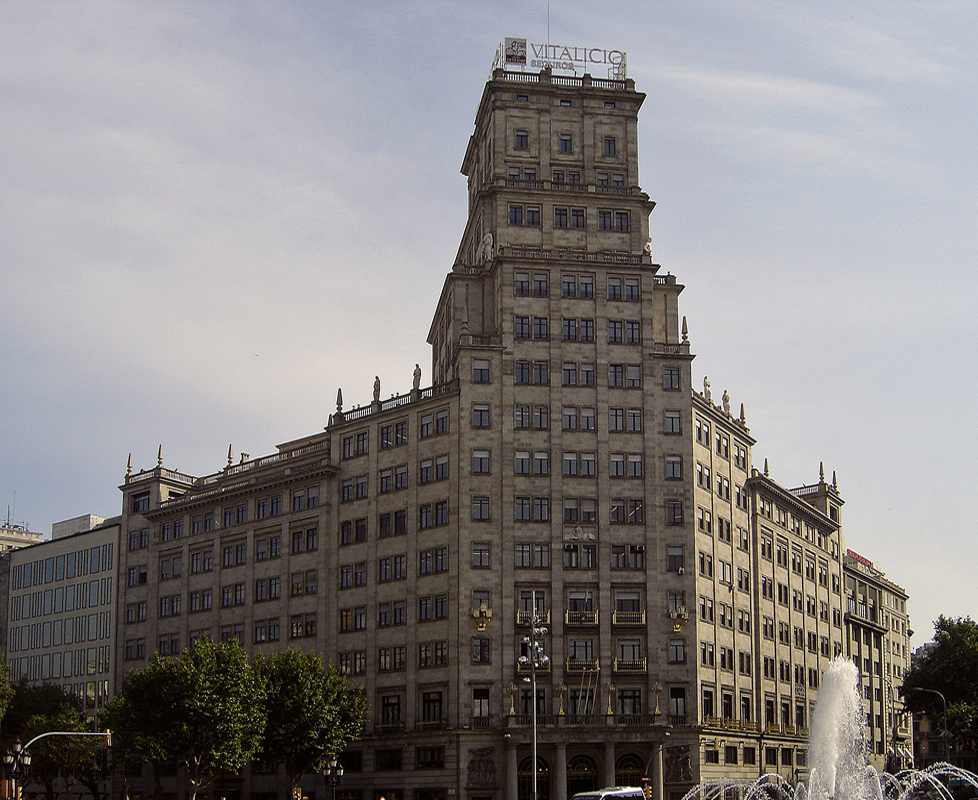
Banco Vitalicio building

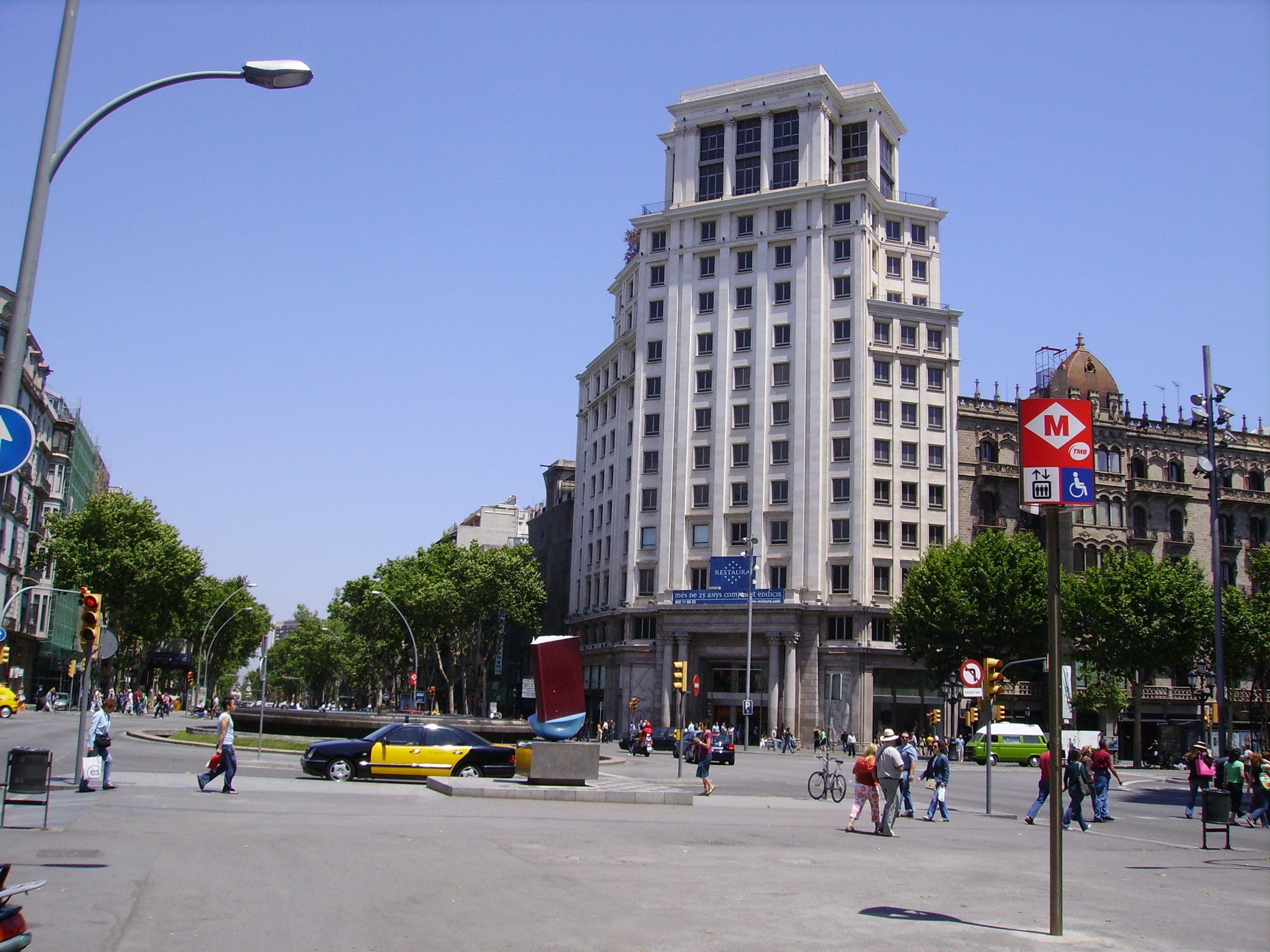
Crossing between Gran Via de les Corts Catalanes and Passeig de Gràcia. Note the red Metro sign.

Gran Via de les Corts Catalanes ("Great Way of the Catalan Courts"), more simply known as Gran Via [ˈɡɾam ˈbi.ə], is one of Barcelona's major avenues. With a length of 13.1 km (8.1 mi), it is the longest street in Catalonia and the 2nd longest in Spain, after Gran Vía de la Manga, in La Manga del Mar Menor. It is also the street with the most street numbers in Spain.

== Location ==
Gran Via crosses the entirety of Barcelona, stretching from the North-Eastern boundaries of the municipality, bordering Sant Adrià de Besòs, to its South-Western limits, in L'Hospitalet de Llobregat, with some of Barcelona's most important squares in between: Plaça d'Espanya, Plaça Universitat, Plaça de Catalunya, Plaça de Tetuan and Plaça de les Glòries Catalanes. To the South and West of Plaça de les Glòries Catalanes, it is a surface boulevard with frontage roads separated from the central roadway by tree-lined pedestrian promenades. To the North and East, the central roadway descends into an open trench and becomes a grade-separated expressway.

== History ==
The late 19th century urban planner Ildefons Cerdà included it as an essential part of his draft for the new "Projecte de reforma i eixample de Barcelona" (nowadays simply known as "Pla Cerdà", or "Cerdà plan" in English), as a wide road linking a number of villages around the coastal part of Barcelona. It was called Lletra N, Número 11 in Cerdà's project, and was renamed Corts in 1900, as a reference to the Medieval and Early Modern General Court of Catalonia, the parliament of the Principality of Catalonia. .

After the Second Spanish Republic was proclaimed in 1931, it was again renamed as Corts Catalanes. Following Franco's victory in the Spanish Civil War in 1939, it was changed to Avenida de José Antonio Primo de Rivera. This lasted until democracy was restored in 1979 and the street was renamed to the current Gran Via de les Corts Catalanes.

== Transportation ==
The first line in the Barcelona metro system, built in the 1920s under the name "Gran Metro", covered the distance between Plaça Catalunya and Plaça Espanya, which is nowadays part of Line 1.

There are currently several metro stations located on Gran Via.

- Ildefons Cerdà (L8)
- Magòria-La Campana (L8)
- Espanya (L1, L3, L8)
- Rocafort (L1)
- Urgell (L1)
- Universitat (L1, L2)
- Passeig de Gràcia (L2, L3, L4)
- Tetuan (L2)
- Glòries (L1)
- Besòs (L4)

Lines T5 and T6 of the Trambesòs tram system also run through its northernmost third. Bus H12 in Barcelona's network traverses Gran Via in its entirety.

== Places of note ==
- Cinema Coliseum
- A 2001 monument to the victims of Fascist Italian aviation bombings during the Spanish Civil War, opposite Cinema Coliseum.
- Font de Diana, a noucentista monument representing goddess Diana by Venanci Vallmitjana (1911–1929)
- Plaça de les Glòries Catalanes
- Banco Vitalicio Building
- Homage to books, monument by Joan Brossa in reference to the annual Book Fair in the Passeig de Gràcia with Gran Via de les Corts Catalanes.
- The Plaza Monumental de Barcelona
- Plaça de la Universitat
- Plaça d'Espanya
- Plaça de Tetuan
- Ciutat de la Justícia de Barcelona i l'Hospitalet de Llobregat

== See also ==
- Ildefons Cerdà
- Eixample, List of streets and squares in Eixample
- Barcelona
- Street names in Barcelona
- Urban planning of Barcelona
