= Outline of Barcelona =

City in Catalonia, Spain

Flag of Barcelona

Coat of arms of Barcelona

The following outline is provided as an overview of and topical guide to Barcelona:

Barcelona – city on the northeastern coast of Spain. It is the capital and largest city of the autonomous community of Catalonia, as well as the second most populous municipality of Spain.

== General reference ==
- Pronunciation: (English: /ˌbɑːrsəˈloʊnə/ BAR-sə-LOH-nə; Catalan: [bəɾsəˈlonə]; Spanish: [baɾθeˈlona]);
- Common English name(s): Barcelona
- Official English name(s): Barcelona
- Adjectival(s): Barcelonian
- Demonym(s): Barcelonian

== Geography of Barcelona ==
Geography of Barcelona

- Barcelona is:
  - a city
    - capital of Catalonia
- Population of Barcelona: 1,620,809
- Area of Barcelona: 101.4 km^{2} (39.2 sq mi)

Barcelona
- Location within Spain
- Coordinates: 41°23′N 2°11′E

=== Location of Barcelona ===
- Barcelona is situated within the following regions:
  - Northern Hemisphere and Western Hemisphere
    - Europe (outline)
      - Southern Europe
      - Iberian Peninsula
        - Spain (outline)
          - Catalonia (outline)
            - Province of Barcelona
              - Barcelona metropolitan area
- Time zone(s):
  - Central European Time (UTC+01)
    - In Summer: Central European Summer Time (UTC+02)

=== Environment of Barcelona ===
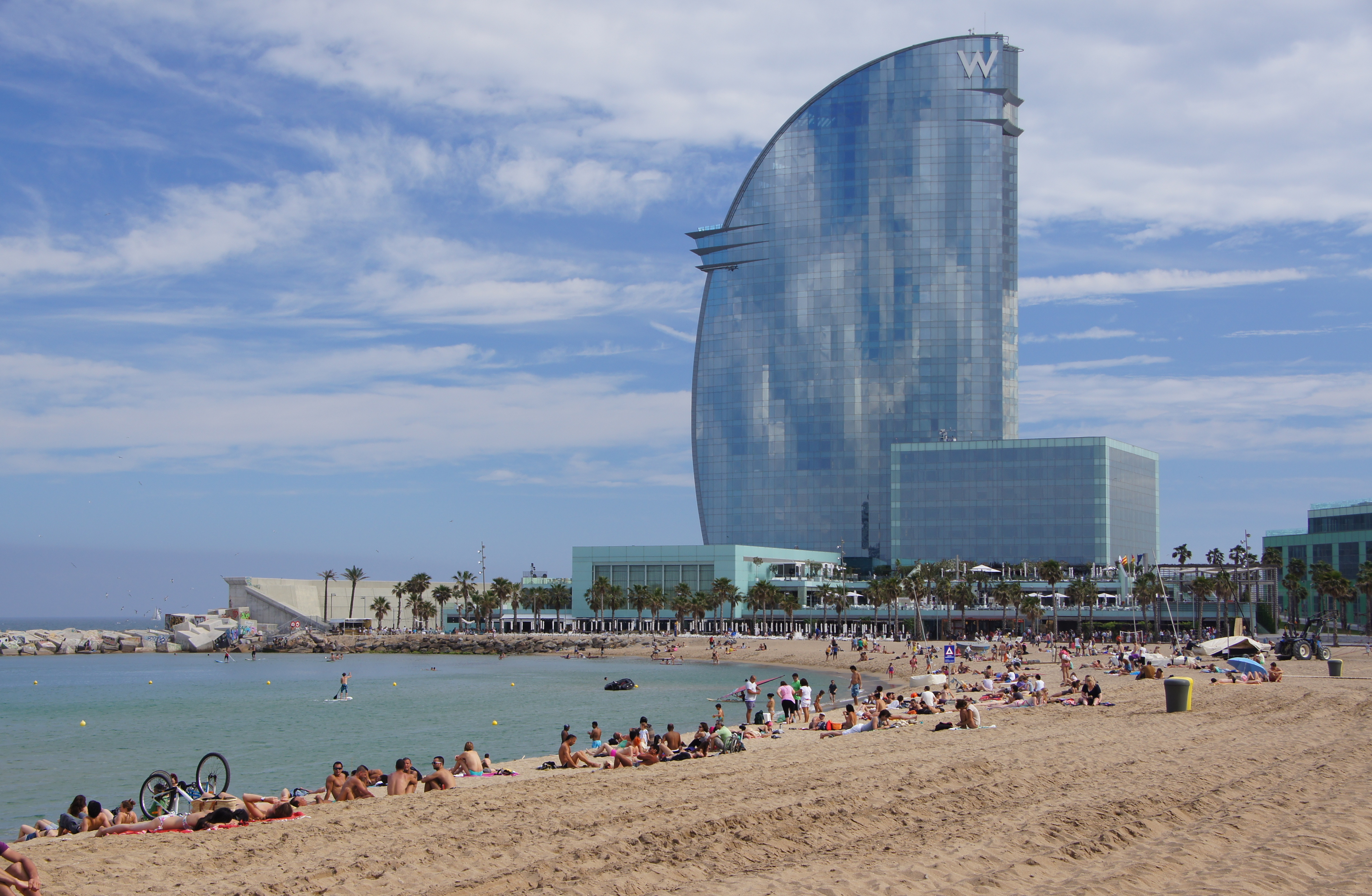
Sant Sebastià, the longest beach in Barcelona

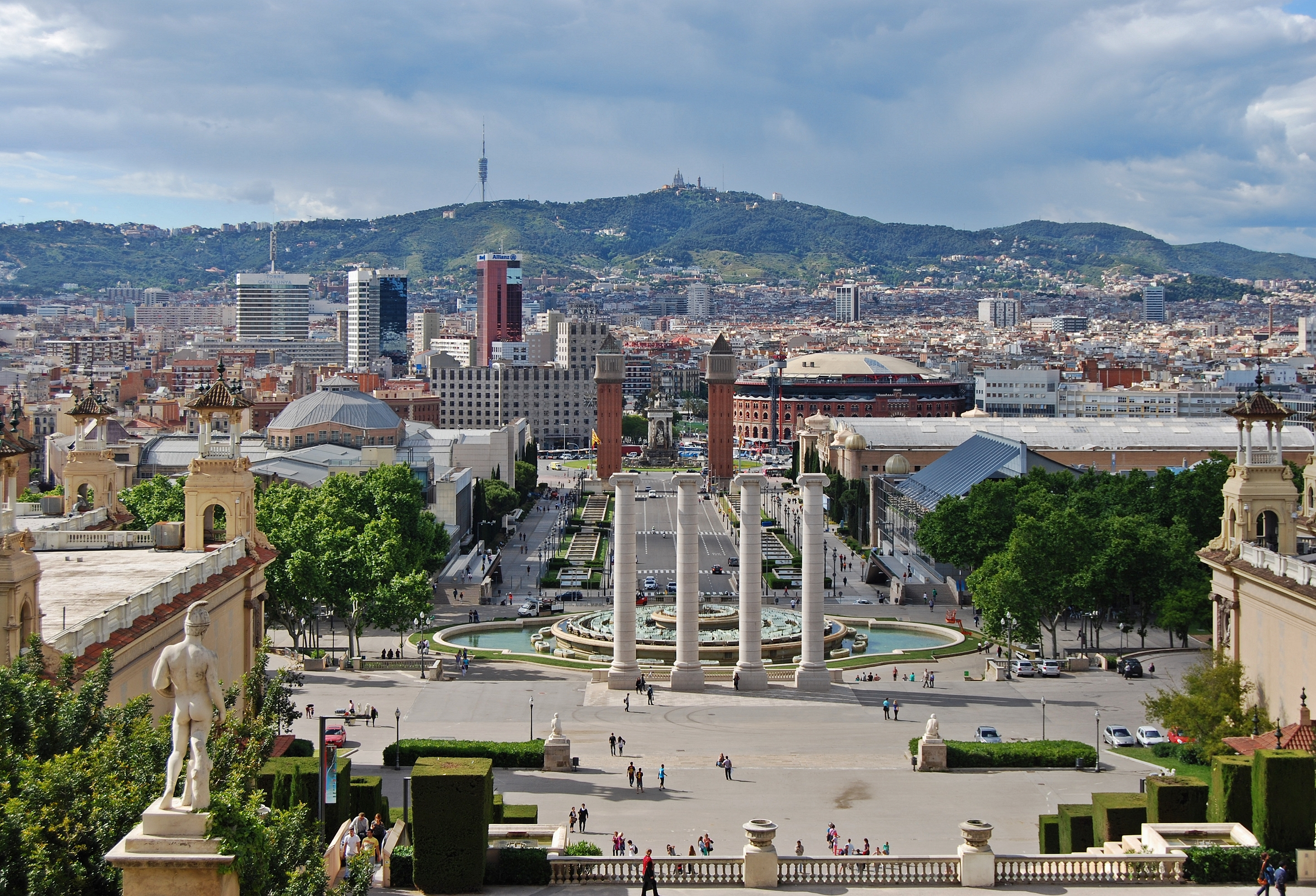
Remote view of Tibidabo mountain

- Climate of Barcelona

==== Natural geographic features of Barcelona ====
- Beaches in Barcelona
  - La Barceloneta
  - Sant Sebastià
  - Somorrostro
- Hills in barcelona
  - Montjuïc
- Mountains in Barcelona
  - Tibidabo

=== Areas of Barcelona ===
- Zona Franca

==== Districts of Barcelona ====
The ten districts of Barcelona

Districts of Barcelona

- Ciutat Vella
- Eixample
- Sants-Montjuïc
- Les Corts
- Sarrià-Sant Gervasi
- Gràcia
- Horta-Guinardó
- Nou Barris
- Sant Andreu
- Sant Martí

==== Neighbourhoods in Barcelona ====
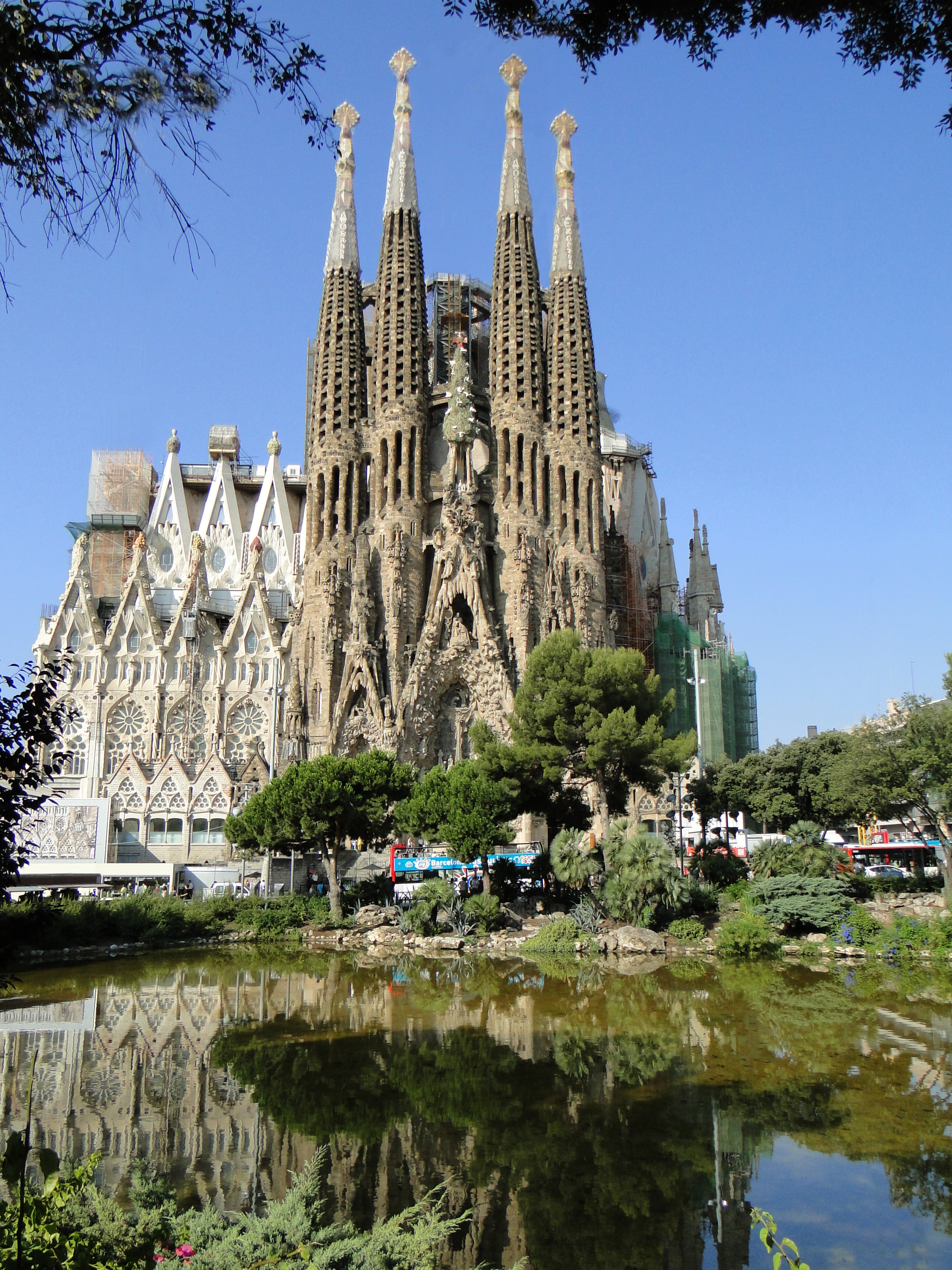
Sagrada Família, a UNESCO World Heritage Site

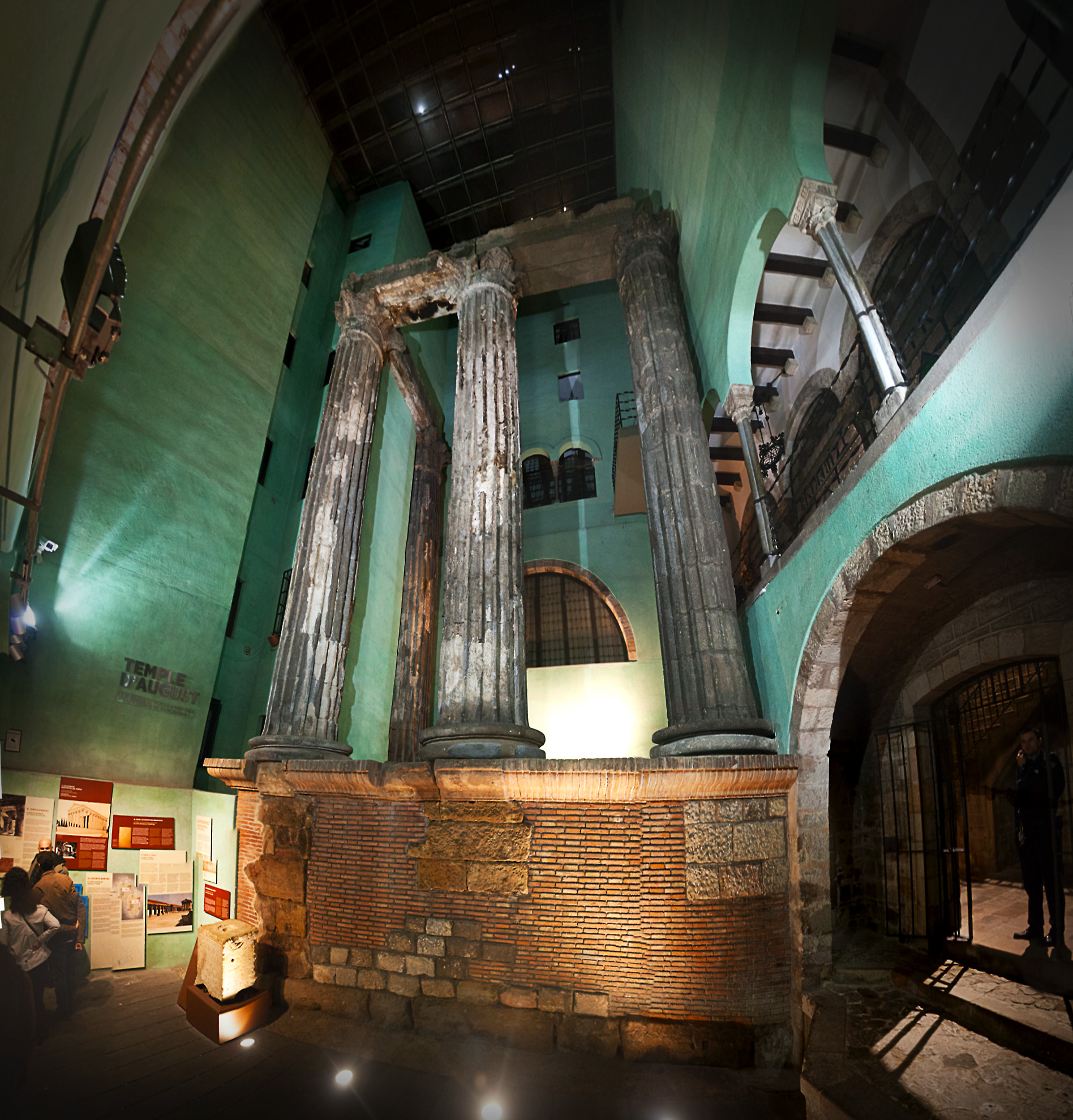
Temple of Augustus

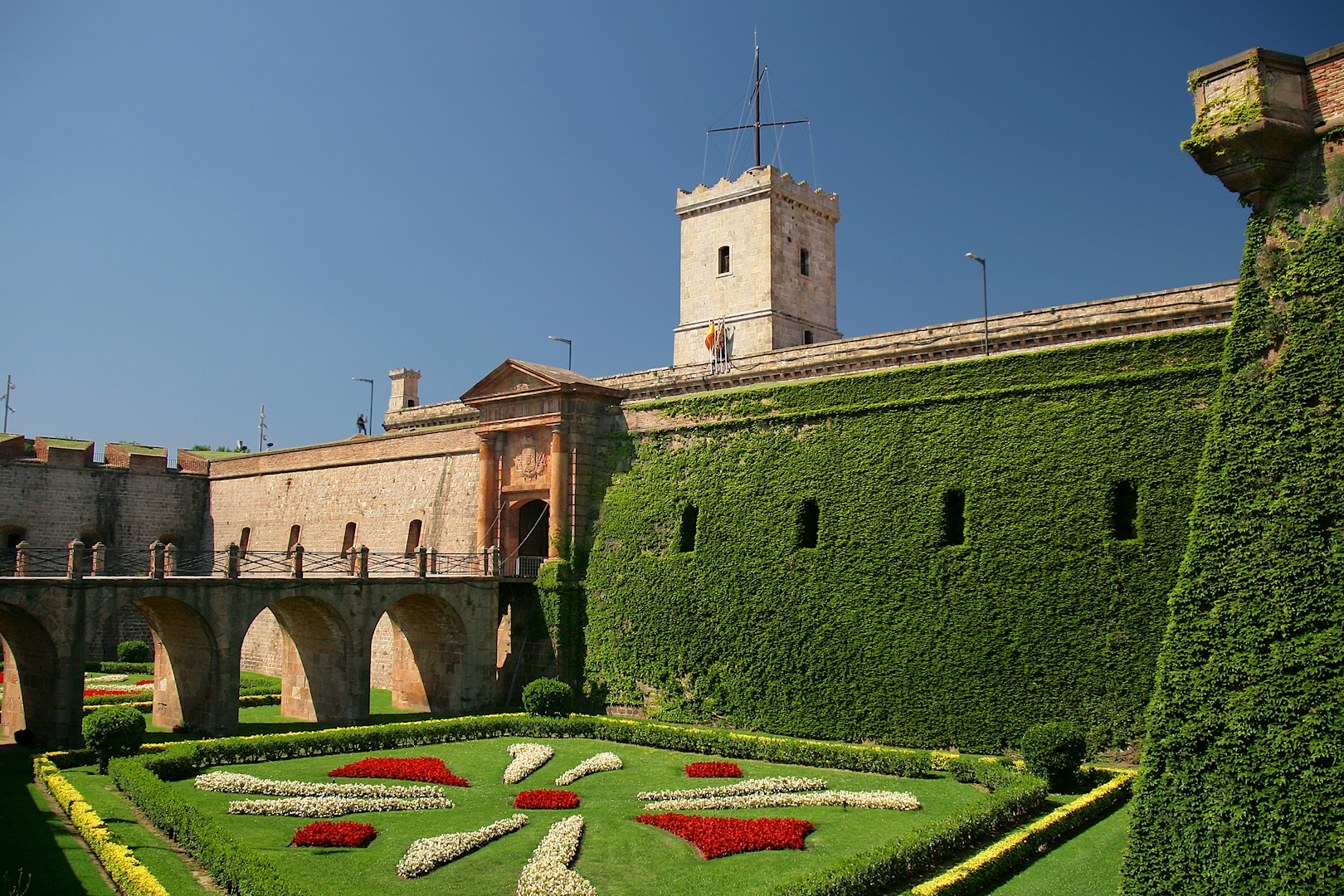
Montjuïc Castle

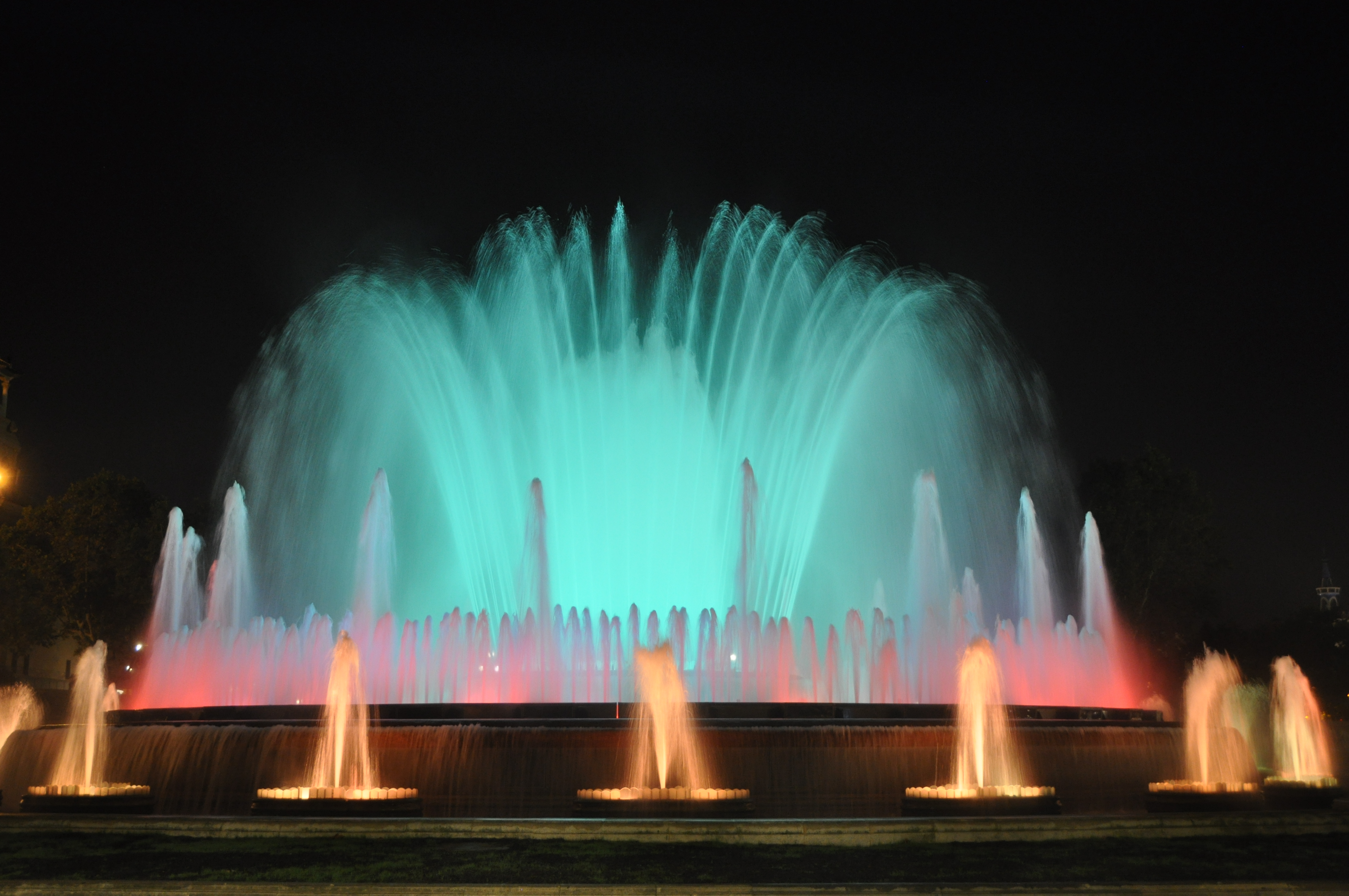
The Magic Fountain of Montjuïc

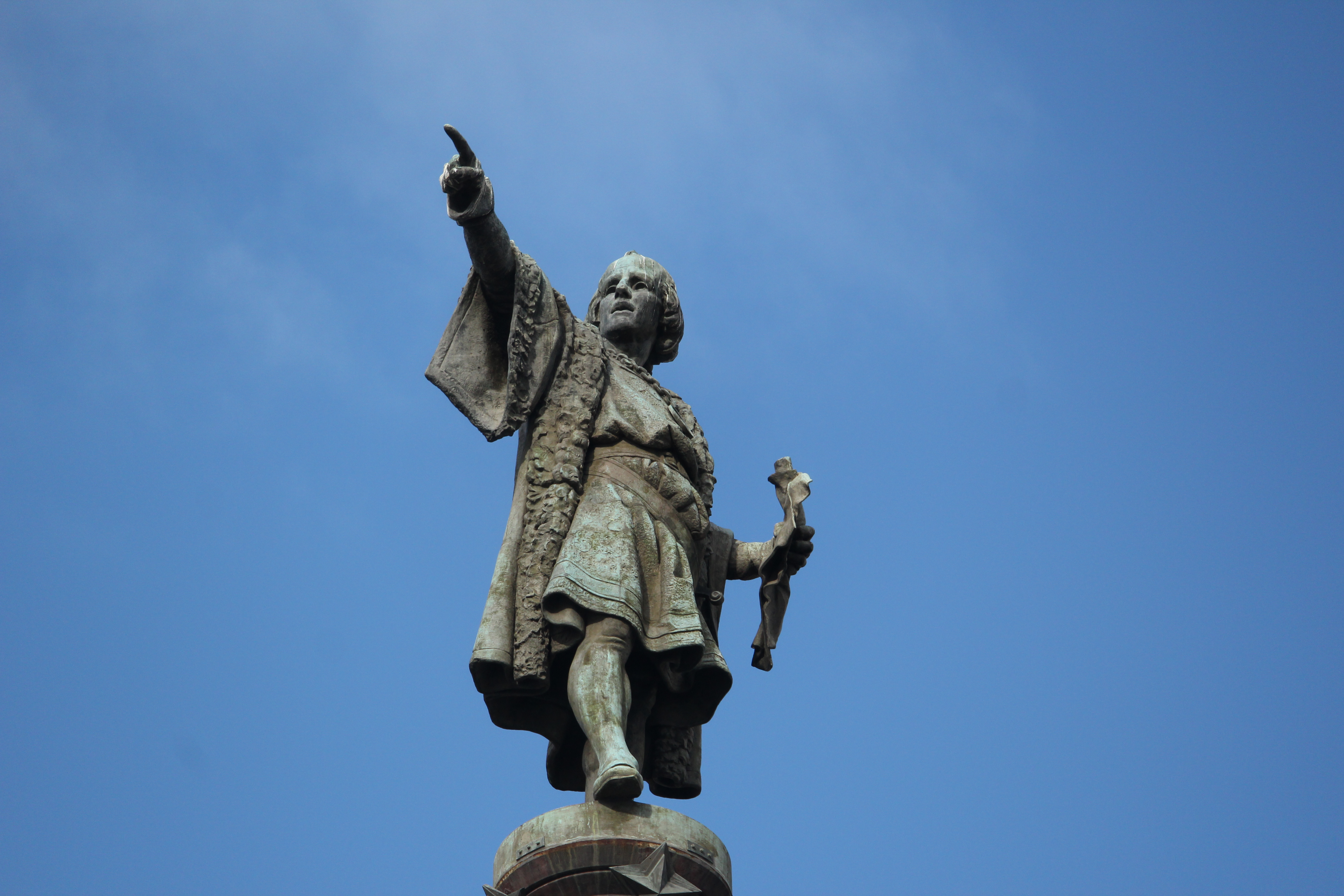
Columbus Monument

- La Barceloneta
- Gothic Quarte

=== Locations in Barcelona ===
- Tourist attractions in Barcelona
  - Museums in Barcelona
  - Shopping areas and markets
    - Markets in Barcelona
  - World Heritage Sites in Barcelona
    - Casa Batlló
    - Casa Milà
    - Casa Vicens
    - Church of Colònia Güell
    - Hospital de Sant Pau
    - Palau de la Música Catalana
    - Palau Güell
    - Park Güell
    - Sagrada Família

==== Ancient monuments in Barcelona ====
- Barcelona Roman amphitheatre and circus
- Temple of Augustus

==== Bridges in Barcelona ====
- Bac de Roda Bridge
- Porta d’Europa

==== Cultural and exhibition centres in Barcelona ====
- Centre de Cultura Contemporània de Barcelona

==== Forts in Barcelona ====
- Montjuïc Castle

==== Fountains in Barcelona ====
Fountains of Barcelona

- Font de Canaletes
- Magic Fountain of Montjuïc

==== Monuments and memorials in Barcelona ====
- Columbus Monument
- Fossar de les Moreres
- The Four Columns

==== Museums and art galleries in Barcelona ====
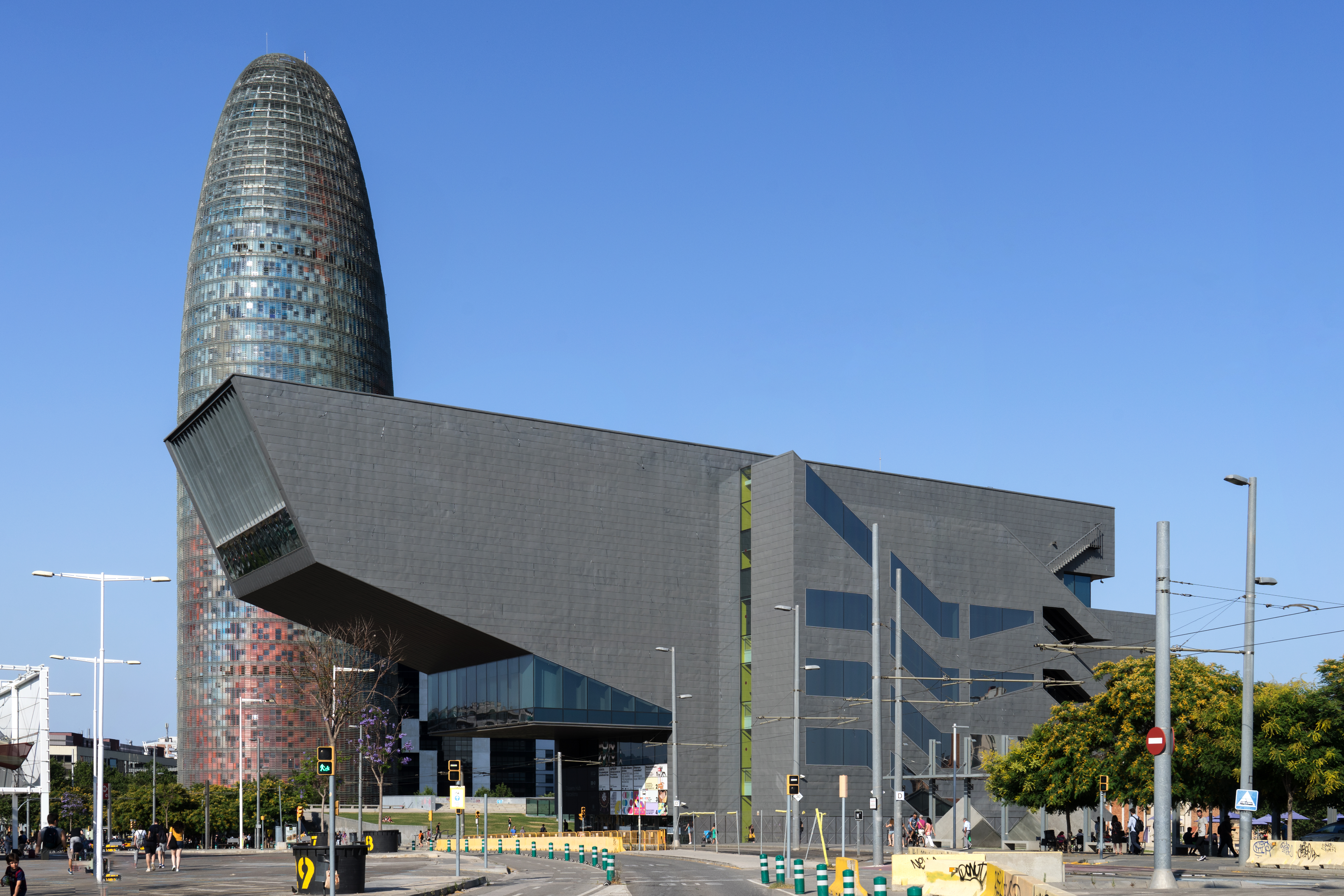
Design Museum of Barcelona

Museums in Barcelona

- Barcelona City History Museum
- Barcelona Museum of Contemporary Art
- Can Framis Museum
- Centre d'Art Santa Mònica
- Design Museum of Barcelona
- FC Barcelona Museum
- Fundació Antoni Tàpies
- Fundació Joan Miró
- Gaudi House Museum
- Maritime Museum of Barcelona
- Museu de la Xocolata
- Museu de la Música de Barcelona
- Museu de les Arts Decoratives
- Museu Nacional d'Art de Catalunya
- Museu Picasso
- Perfume Museum
- Poble Espanyol
- Sala Parés

==== Palaces and villas in Barcelona ====
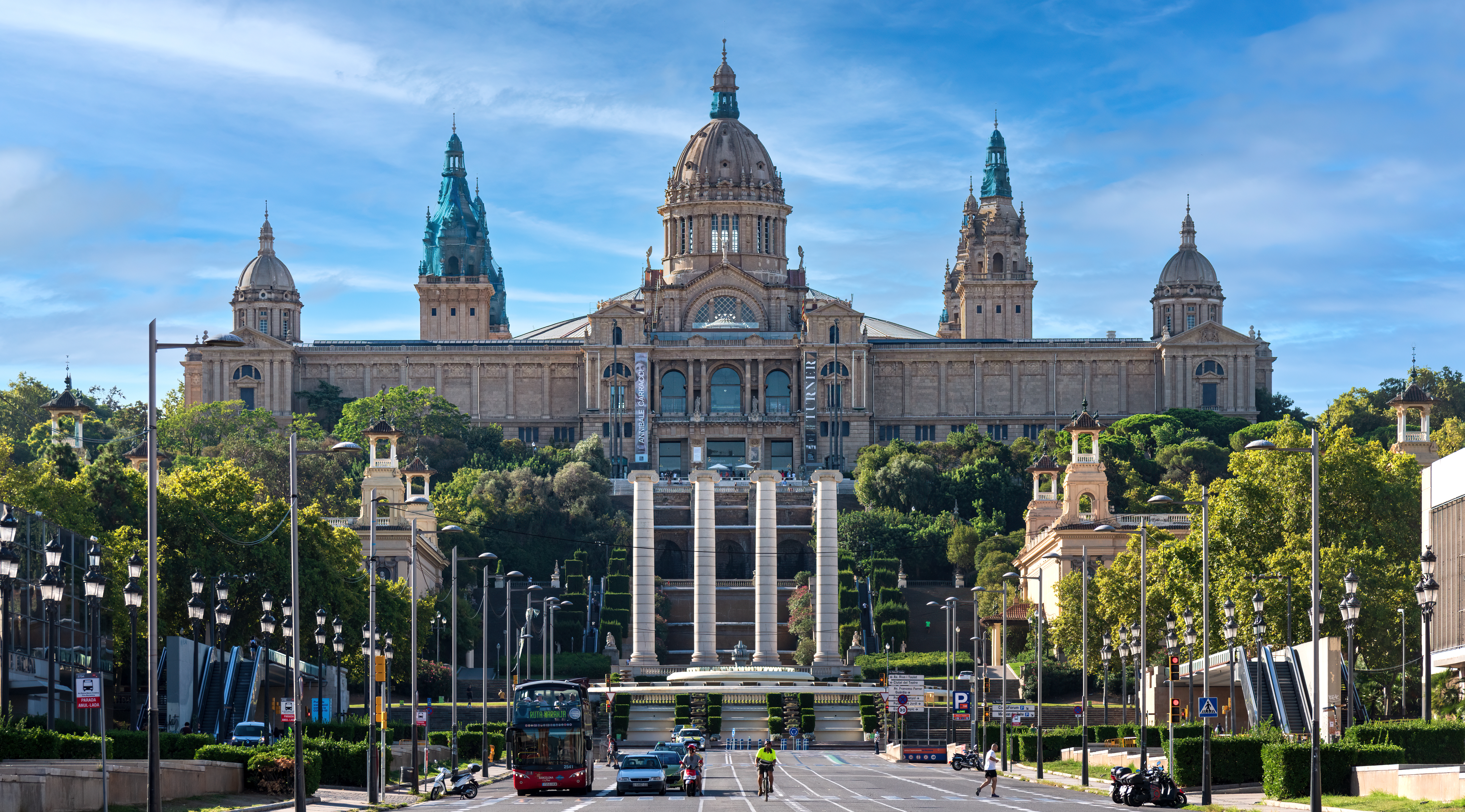
The Palau Nacional, home to the National Art Museum of Catalonia

- Bellesguard
- Palau de la Generalitat de Catalunya
- Palau del Parlament de Catalunya
- Palau Güell
- Palau Nacional
- Palau Reial de Pedralbes
- Palau Reial Major
- Palau Robert
- Virreina Palace

==== Parks and gardens in Barcelona ====
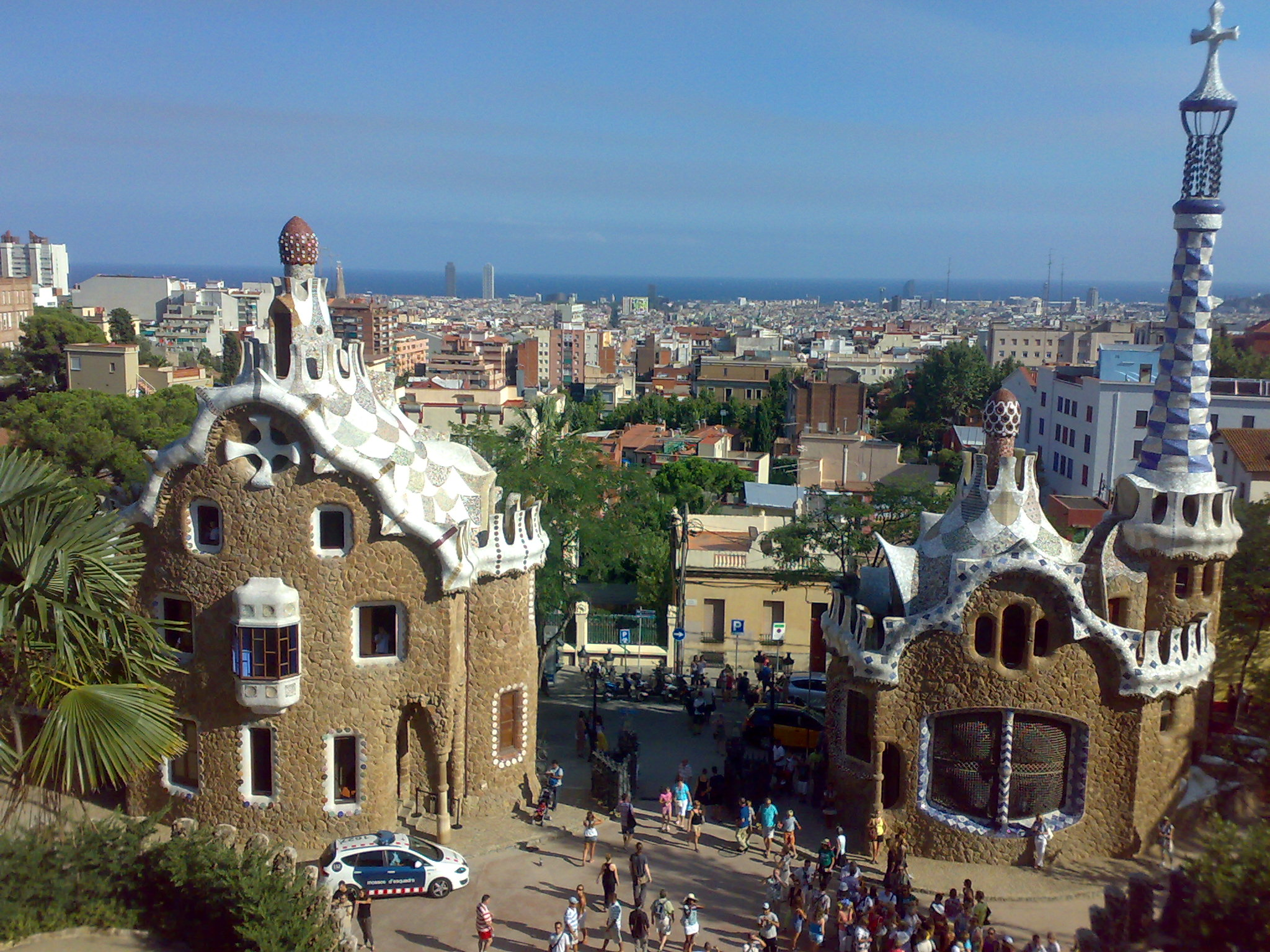
Park Güell

- Catalunya en Miniatura
- Jardí Botànic de Barcelona
- Mossèn Costa i Llobera Gardens
- Oreneta Park
- Parc de la Ciutadella
- Parc de la Creueta del Coll
- Parc del Laberint d'Horta
- Park Güell

==== Public squares in Barcelona ====
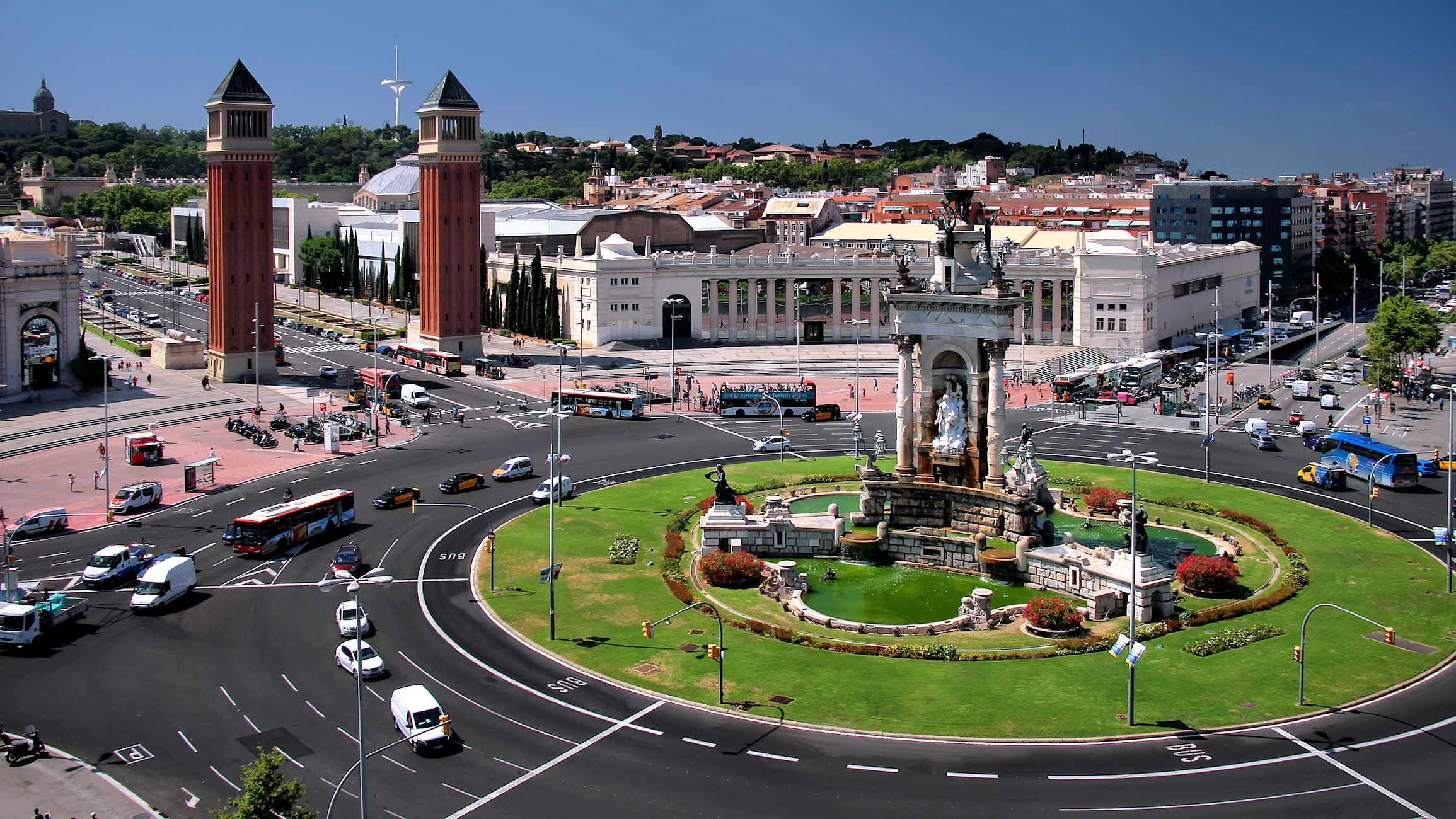
Plaça d'Espanya

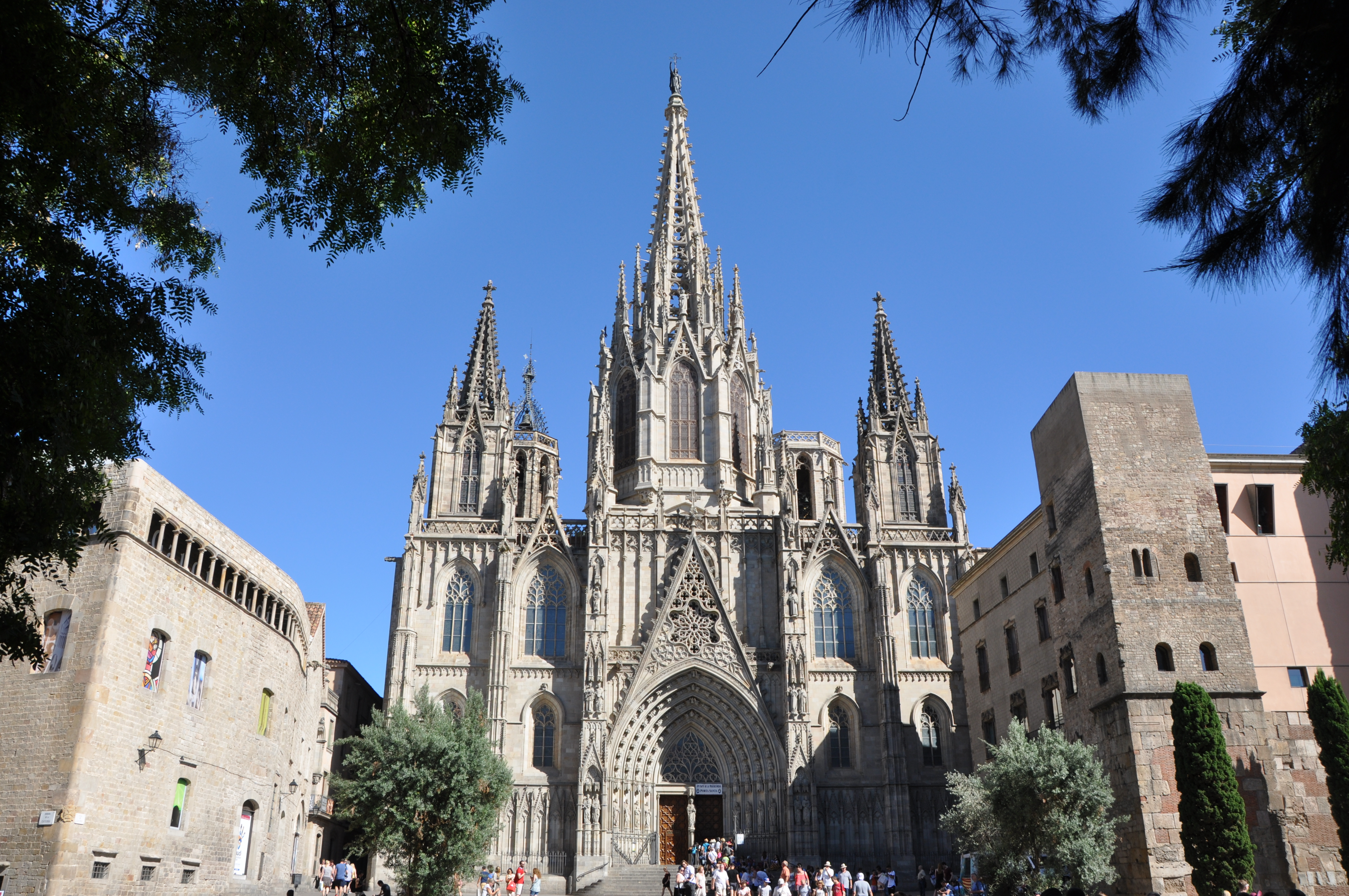
Barcelona Cathedral

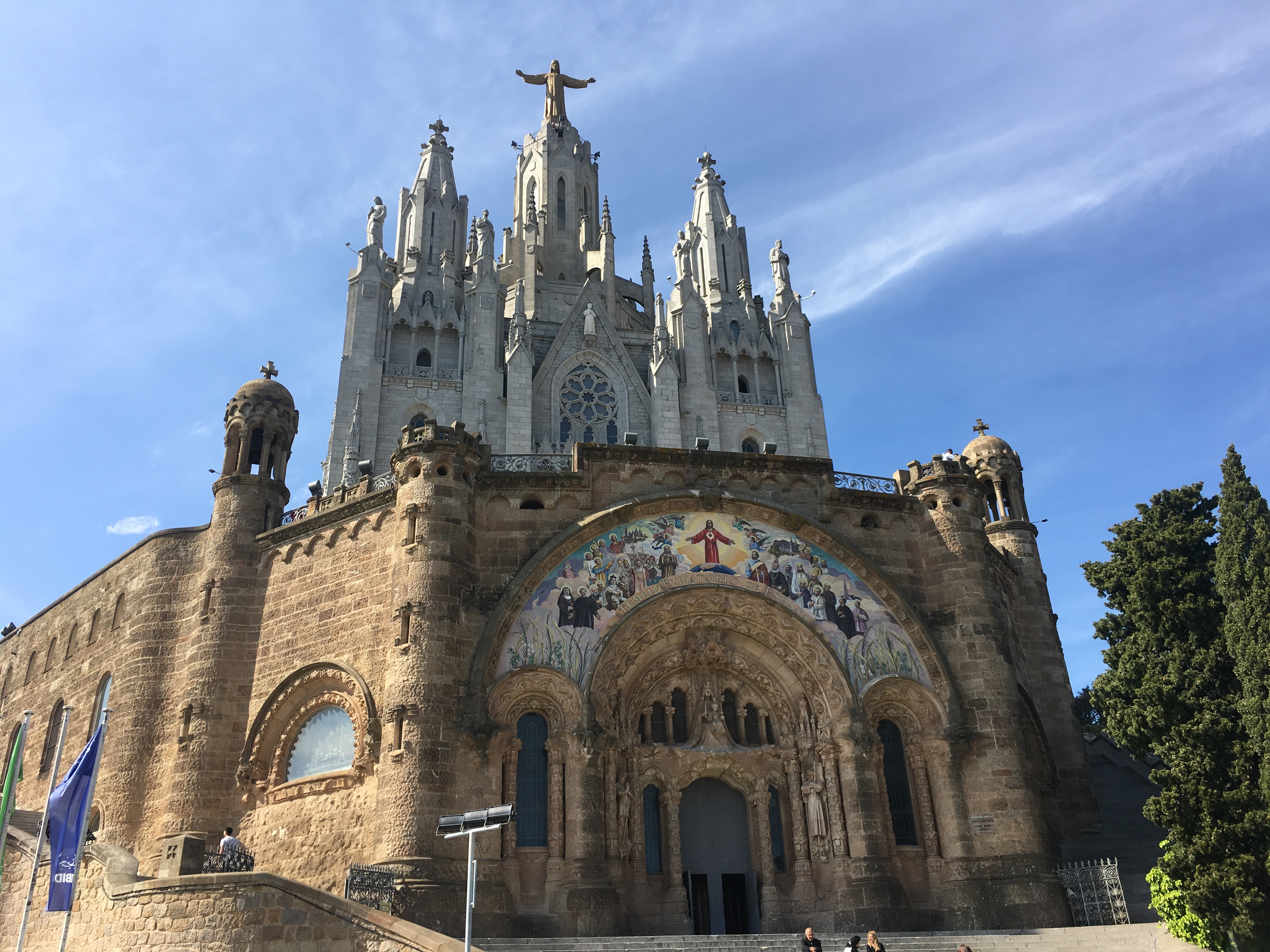
Temple Expiatori del Sagrat Cor

- Plaça d'Espanya
- Plaça d'Europa
- Plaça d'Ildefons Cerdà
- Plaça de Catalunya
- Plaça de Francesc Macià
- Plaça de Mossèn Jacint Verdaguer
- Plaça de Sant Felip Neri
- Plaça de la Universitat
- Plaça de les Glòries Catalanes
- Plaça del Rei
- Plaça Sant Jaume
- Plaça Urquinaona

==== Religious buildings in Barcelona ====
- Barcelona Cathedral
- Church of Colònia Güell
- Church of Saint Philip Neri
- Monastery of Pedralbes
- Sagrada Família
- Sant Pau del Camp
- Santa Maria del Mar
- Santa Maria del Pi
- Temple Expiatori del Sagrat Cor

==== Secular buildings in Barcelona ====
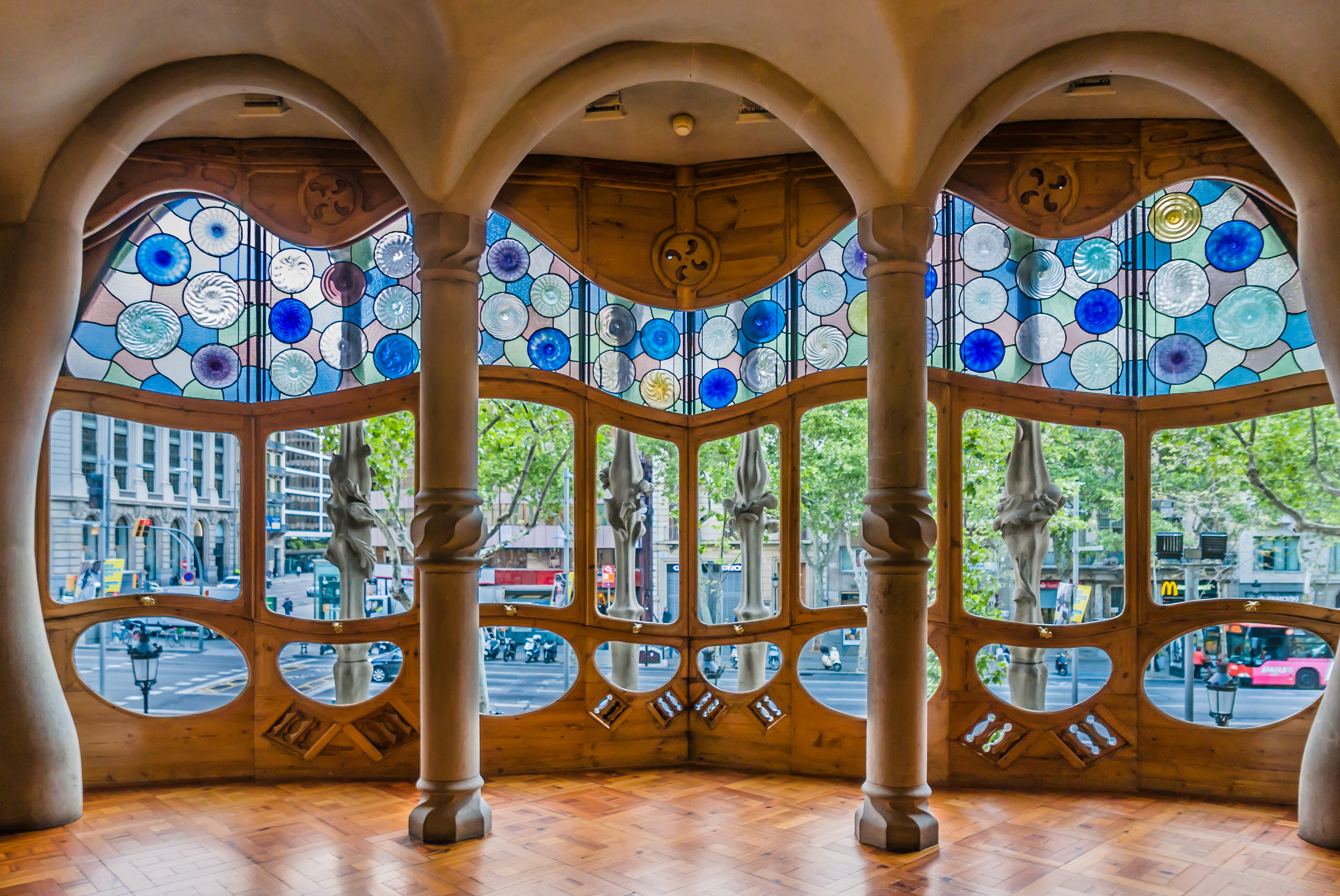
Casa Batlló, the piano nobile

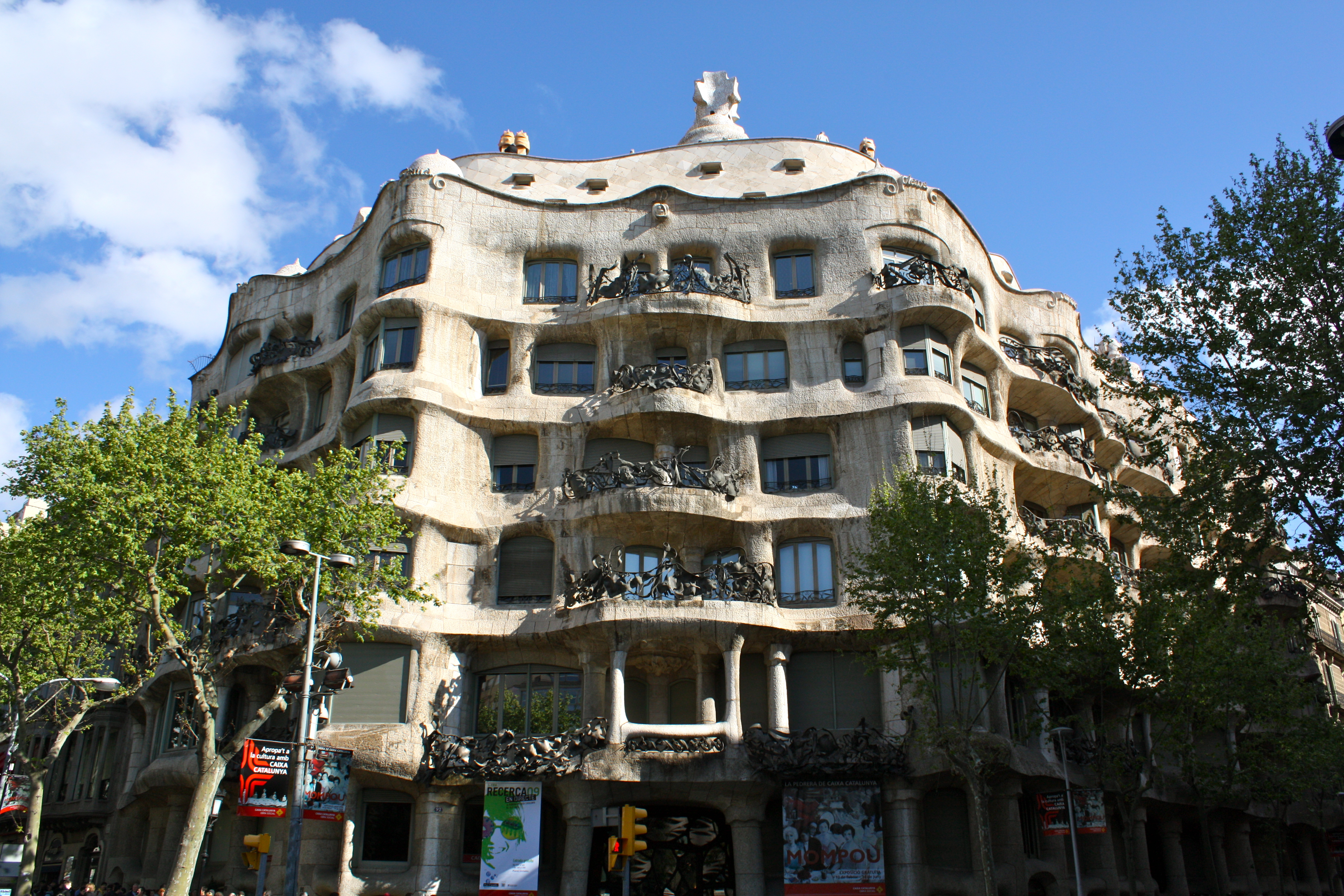
Casa Milà

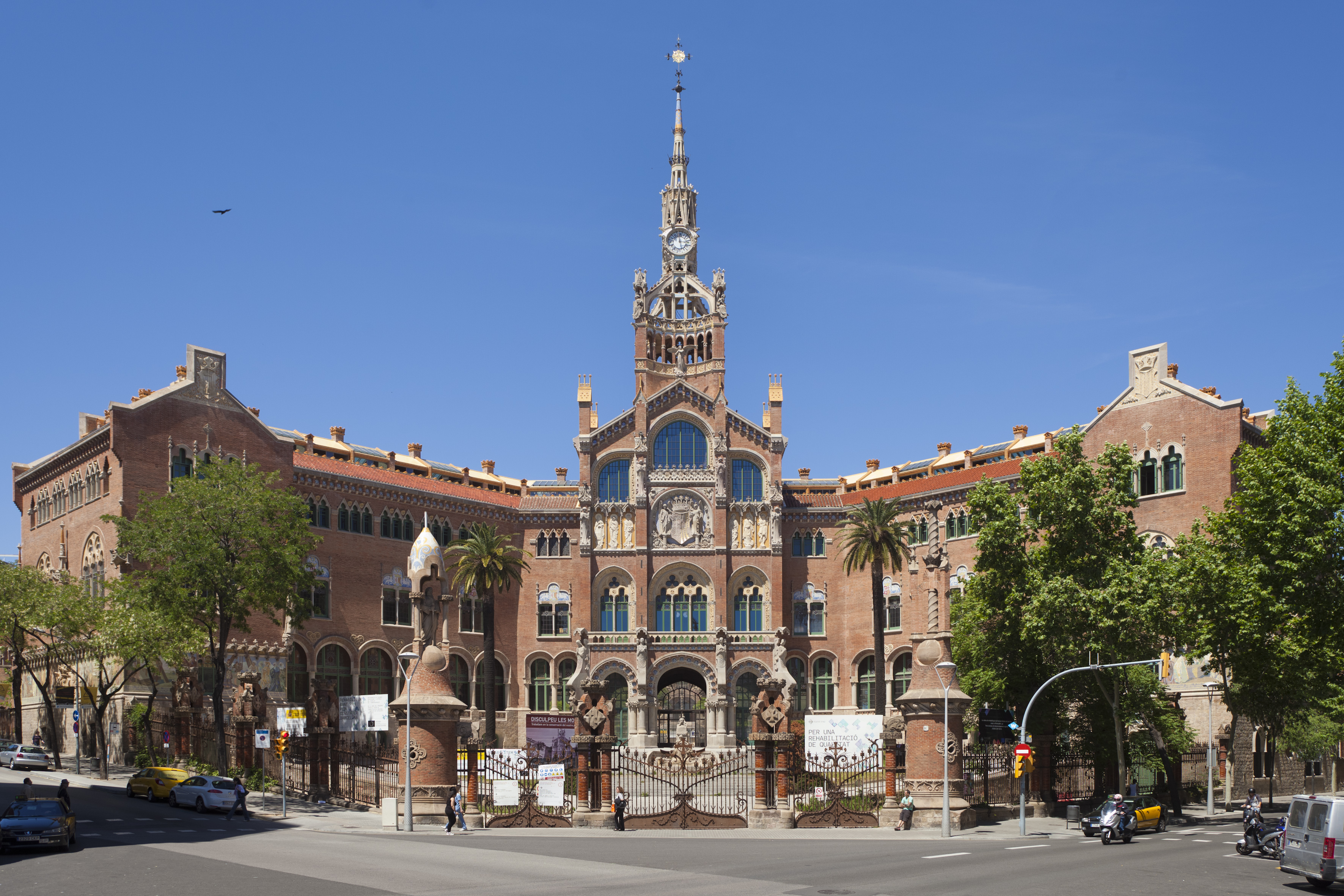
Hospital de Sant Pau

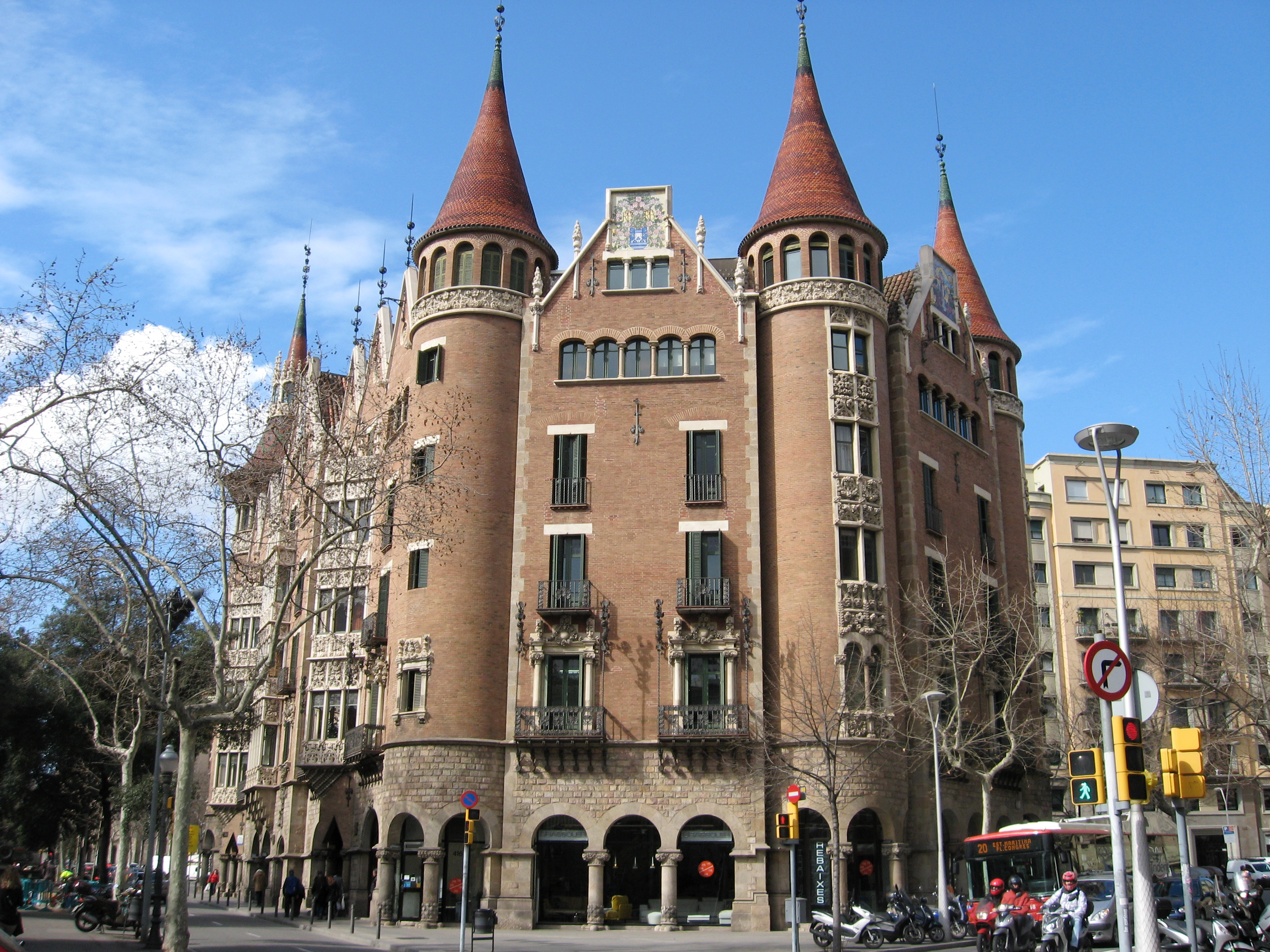
Casa de les Punxes

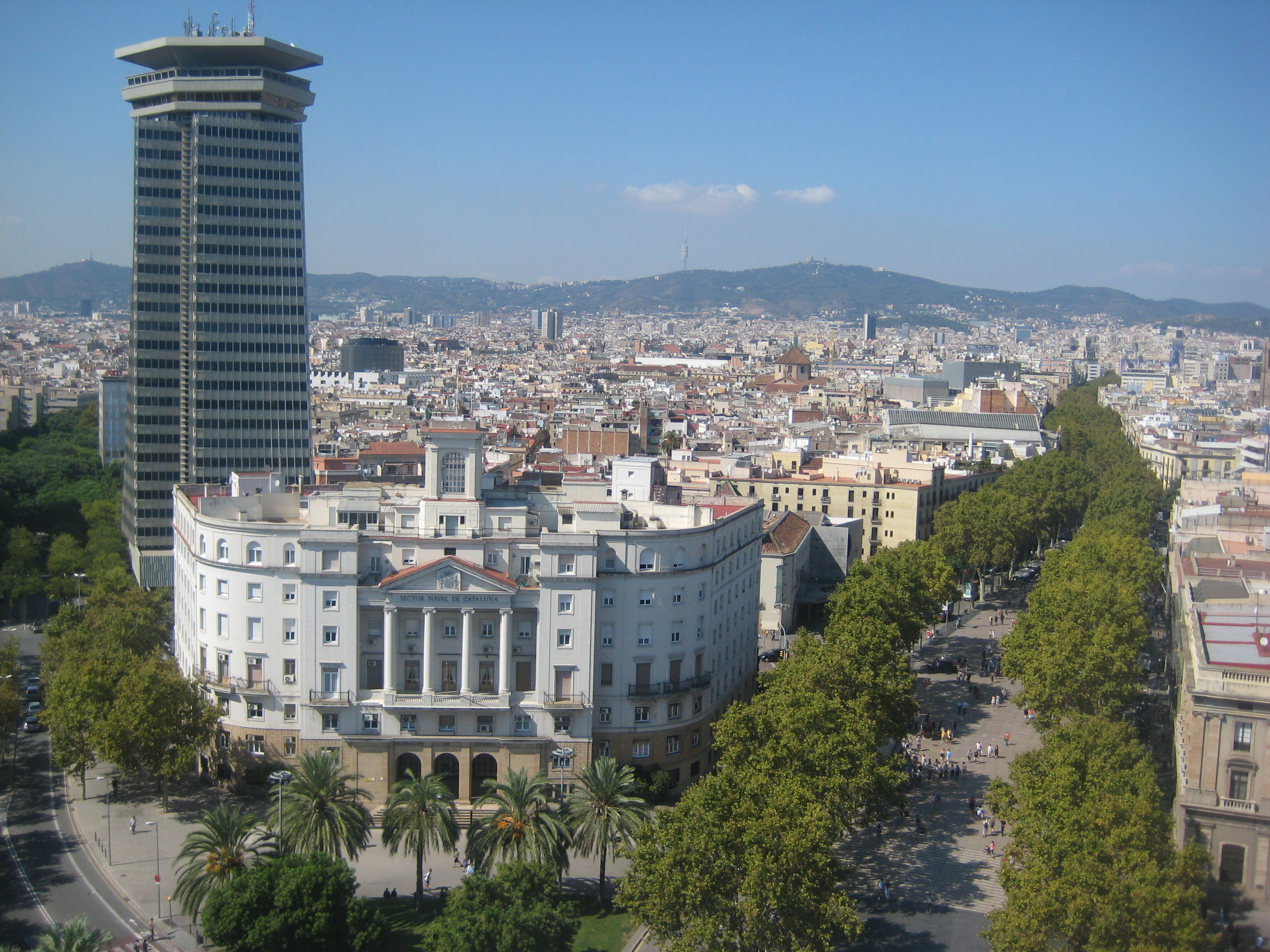
View of La Rambla from Columbus monument

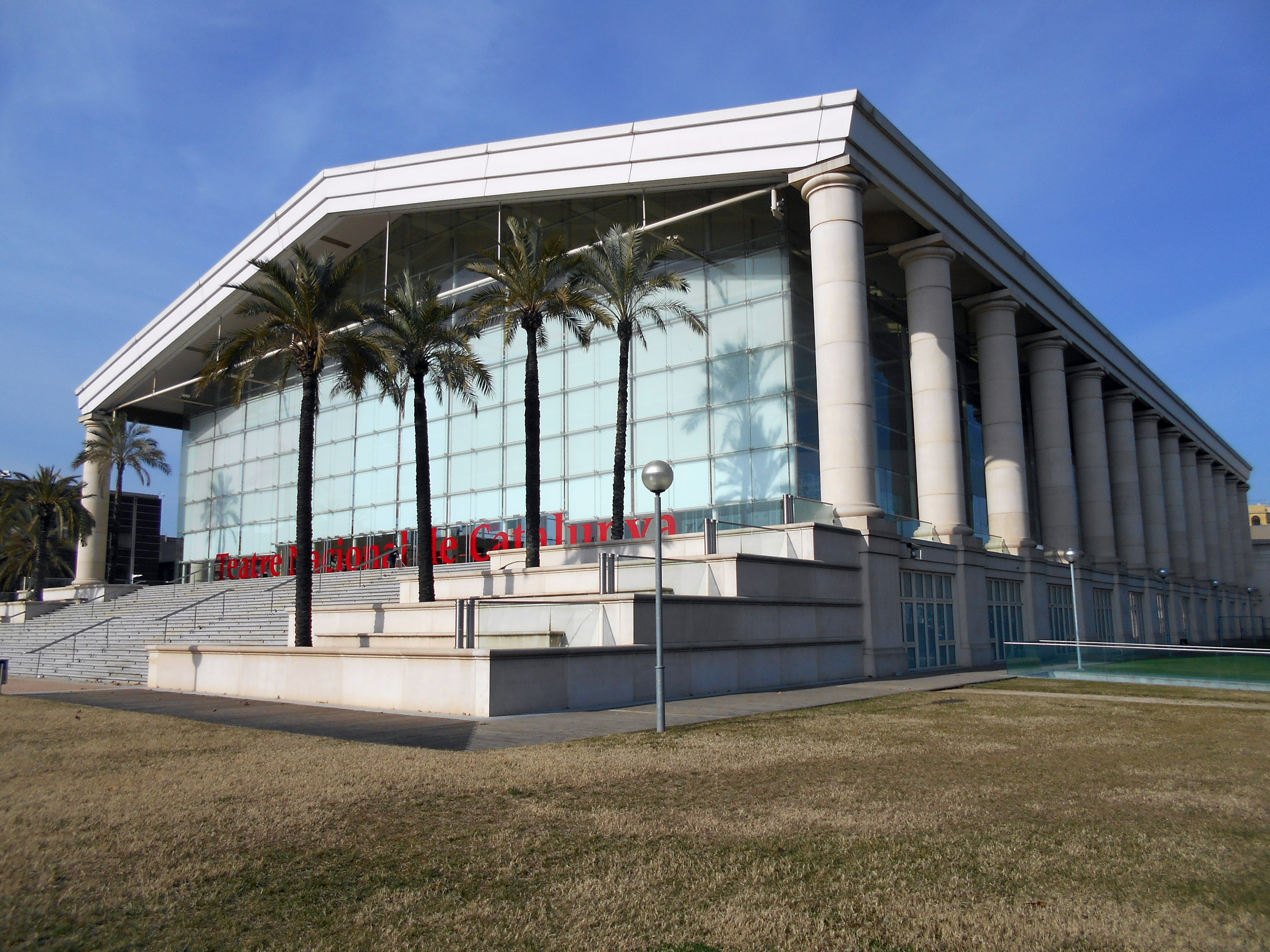
Teatre Nacional de Catalunya

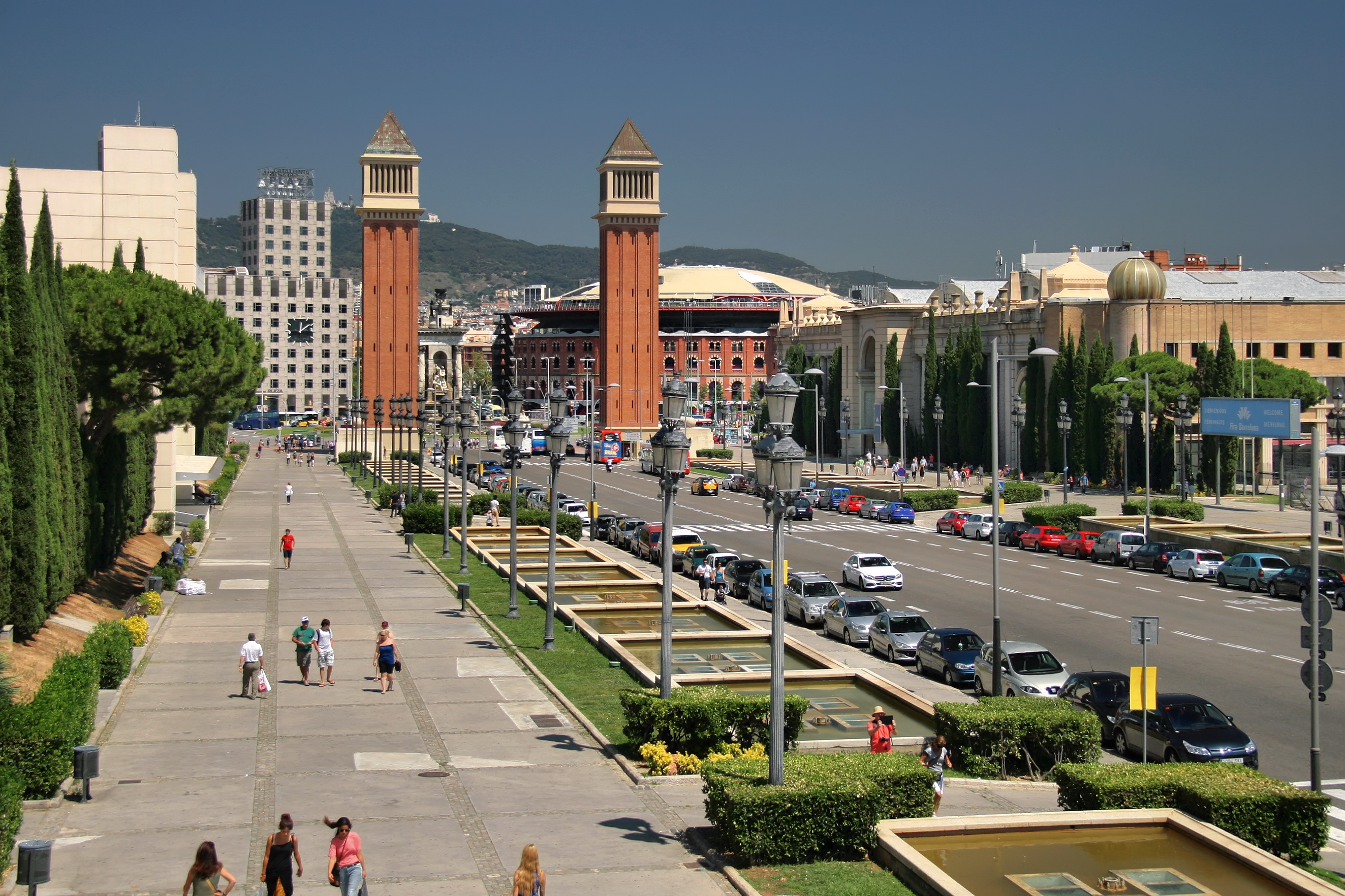
The Venetian Towers

- Aquarium Barcelona
- Barcelona Pavilion
- Barcelona Royal Shipyard
- Casa Amatller
- Casa Batlló
- Casa Bloc
- Casa Bonaventura Ferrer
- Casa Calvet
- Casa de les Punxes
- Casa Lleó Morera
- Casa Martí
- Casa Milà
- Casa Padellàs
- Casa Serra
- Casa Trinxet
- Casa Vicens
- Cases Marfà
- Castle of the Three Dragons
- Ciutat de la Justícia de Barcelona i l'Hospitalet de Llobregat
- Diagonal Zero Zero
- Edifici de Sindicats
- Edifici Gas Natural
- Edificio Colón
- Fabra Observatory
- Forum Building
- Güell Pavilions
- Hospital de Sant Pau
- Illa de la Discòrdia
- La Monumental
- Old Hospital de la Santa Creu
- Torre Glòries
- Torre Mapfre
- Walden 7
- World Trade Center Barcelona

==== Streets in Barcelona ====
- Avinguda de Josep Tarradellas, Barcelona
- Avinguda del Paral·lel
- Avinguda Diagonal
- Avinguda Meridiana
- Gran Via de les Corts Catalanes
- Passeig de Gràcia
- Portal de l'Àngel
- La Rambla
- Rambla de Catalunya
- Travessera de Dalt
- Via Laietana

==== Theatres in Barcelona ====
- Coliseum (Barcelona)
- Teatre Grec
- Teatre Lliure
- Teatre Nacional de Catalunya
- Teatre Principal

==== Triumphal arches in Barcelona ====
- Arc de Triomf

==== Towers in Barcelona ====
- Montjuïc Communications Tower
- Torre de Collserola
- Torre Jaume I
- Torre Sant Sebastià
- Venetian Towers

=== Demographics of Barcelona ===
Demographics of Barcelona

== Government and politics of Barcelona ==
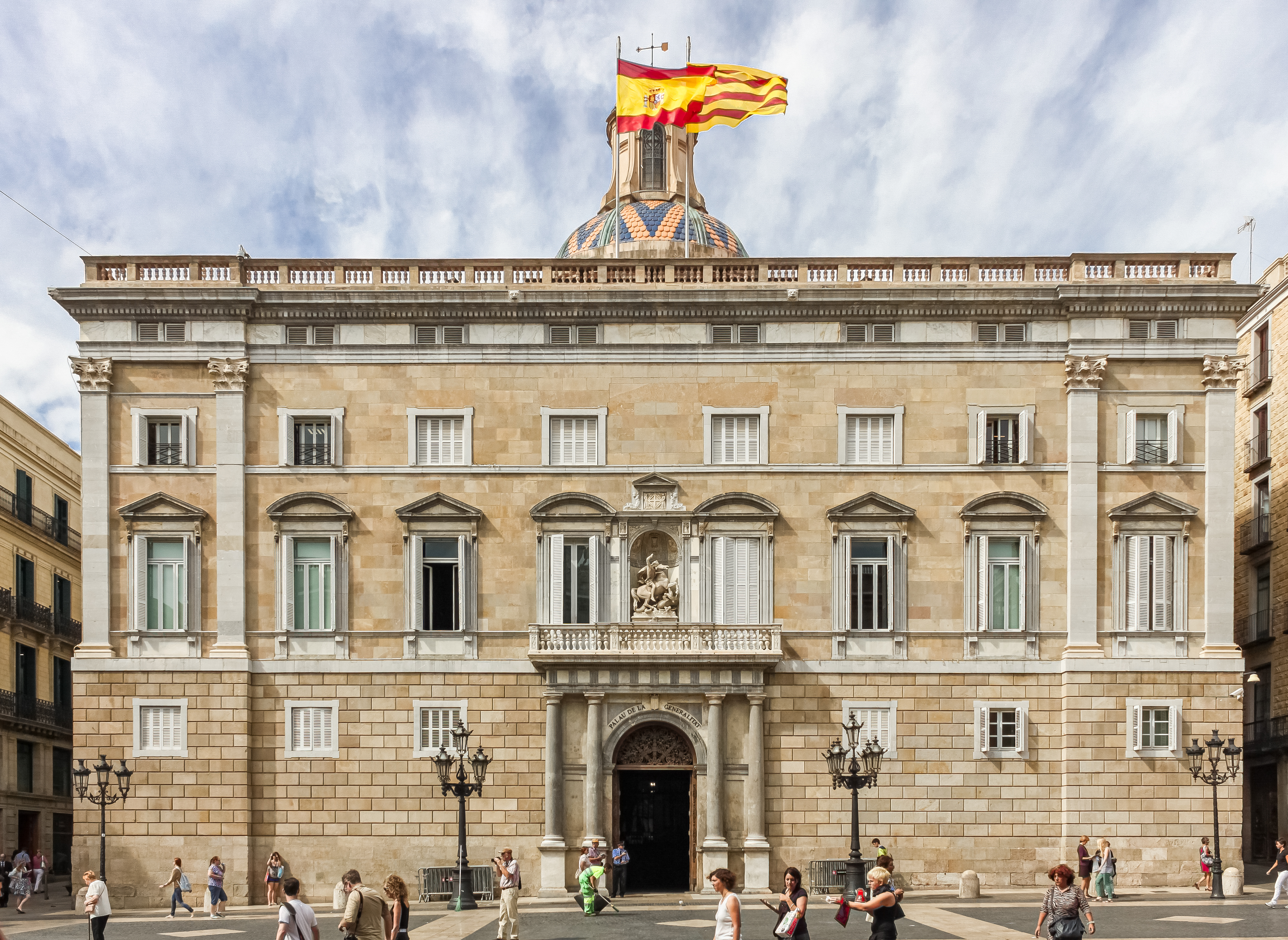
Palau de la Generalitat de Catalunya

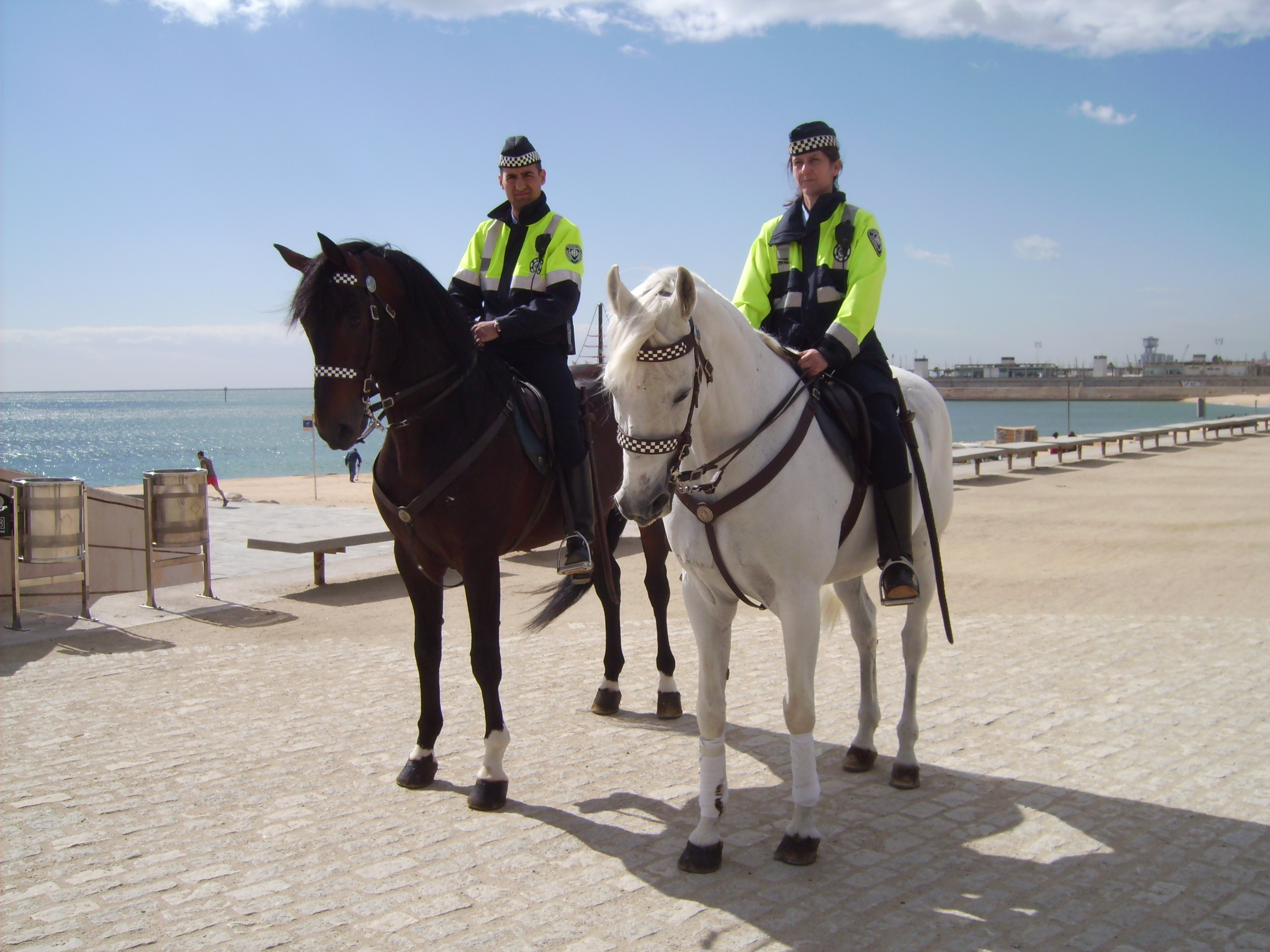
Guàrdia Urbana mounted police

Politics of Barcelona

- Generalitat de Catalunya
  - Executive Council of Catalonia
  - Parliament of Catalonia
  - President of the Government of Catalonia
    - List of presidents of the Government of Catalonia
- High Court of Justice of Catalonia
- Mayors of Barcelona
- Municipal elections in Barcelona
- International relations of Barcelona
  - Twin towns and sister cities of Barcelona

=== Law and order in Barcelona ===
- Law enforcement in Barcelona
  - Guàrdia Urbana de Barcelona
  - Mossos d'Esquadra

== History of Barcelona ==
History of Barcelona

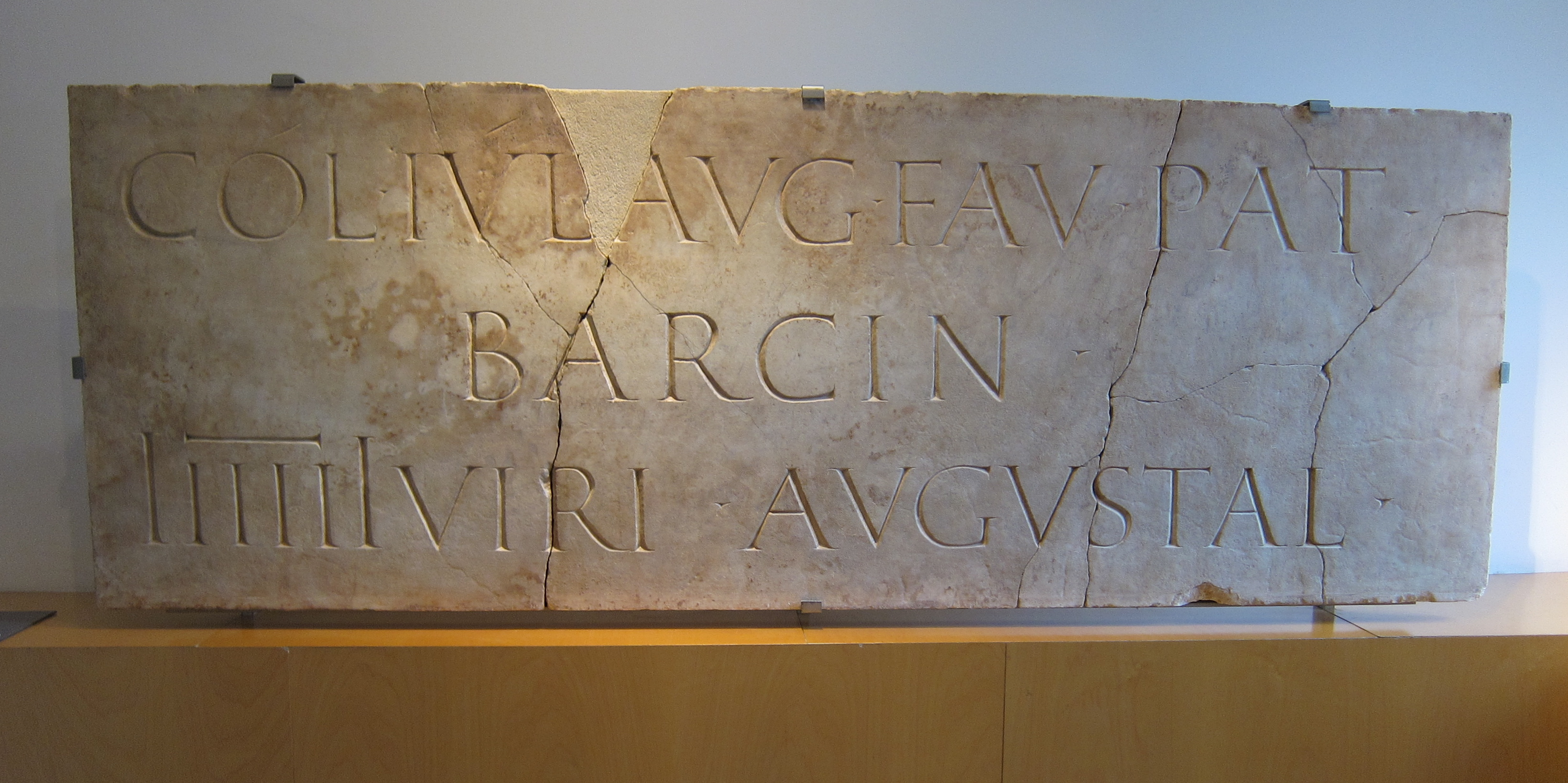
A Roman marble with Latin text "COL IVL AVG FAV PAT BARCIN", short for Colonia Julia Augusta Faventia Paterna Barcino, the ancient name of Barcelona

=== History of Barcelona, by period or event ===
Timeline of Barcelona

- Prehistory and origin of Barcelona
- Roman Barcelona
  - Barcelona is settled by the Romans under the name of Barcino (ca. 15 BC)
- Medieval Barcelona
  - The city is conquered by the Visigoths and becomes for a few years the capital of Hispania (5th century)
  - After being conquered by the Arabs in the early 8th century, Barcelona is conquered by Charlemagne's son Louis and incorporated into the Frankish kingdom (801)
    - Barcelona in the Spanish March
    - Barcelona under the Crown of Aragon
- Barcelona under the Spanish monarchy
  - Much of Barcelona is negatively affected by the Napoleonic wars. The city is annexed by Napoleonic France and incorporated into the First French Empire (1812)
- The Spanish Civil War and the Franco period (1936–1975)
  - Barcelona becomes capital of the Republic of Spain from November 1937 until January 1939
  - The city falls into Nationalist hands on 26 January 1939
- Modern Barcelona (1975–present)

=== History of Barcelona, by subject ===
- Battle of Barcelona
- Bombing of Barcelona
- Siege of Barcelona (1651)

== Culture of Barcelona ==
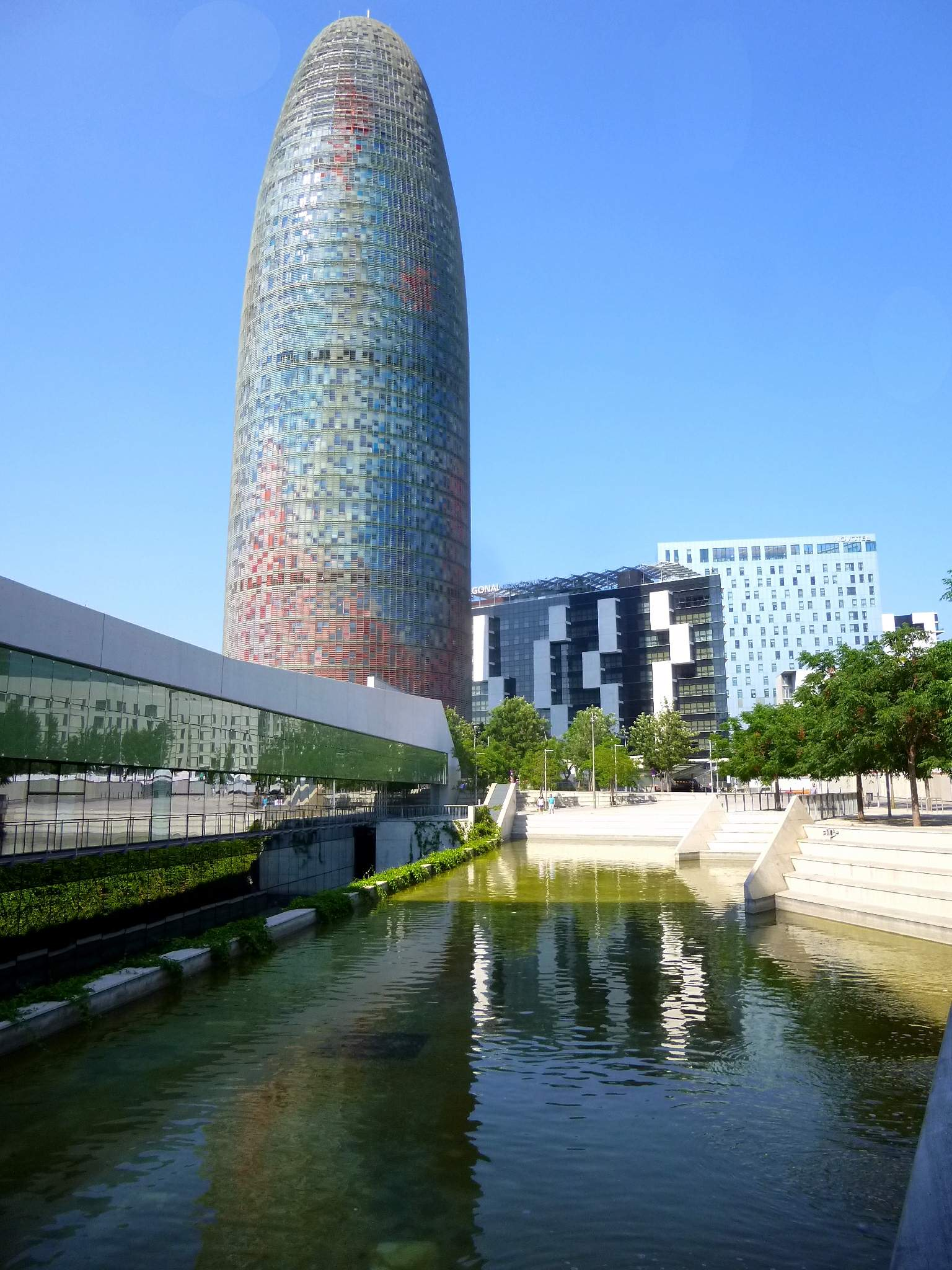
Torre Glòries, a high-tech architecture building

Culture of Barcelona

=== Arts in Barcelona ===
==== Architecture of Barcelona ====
Architecture of Barcelona

- Buildings in Barcelona
  - Modernista buildings in Barcelona
  - Tallest buildings in Barcelona

==== Cinema of Barcelona ====
- Barcelona School of Film
- Filmoteca de Catalunya

==== Music of Barcelona ====
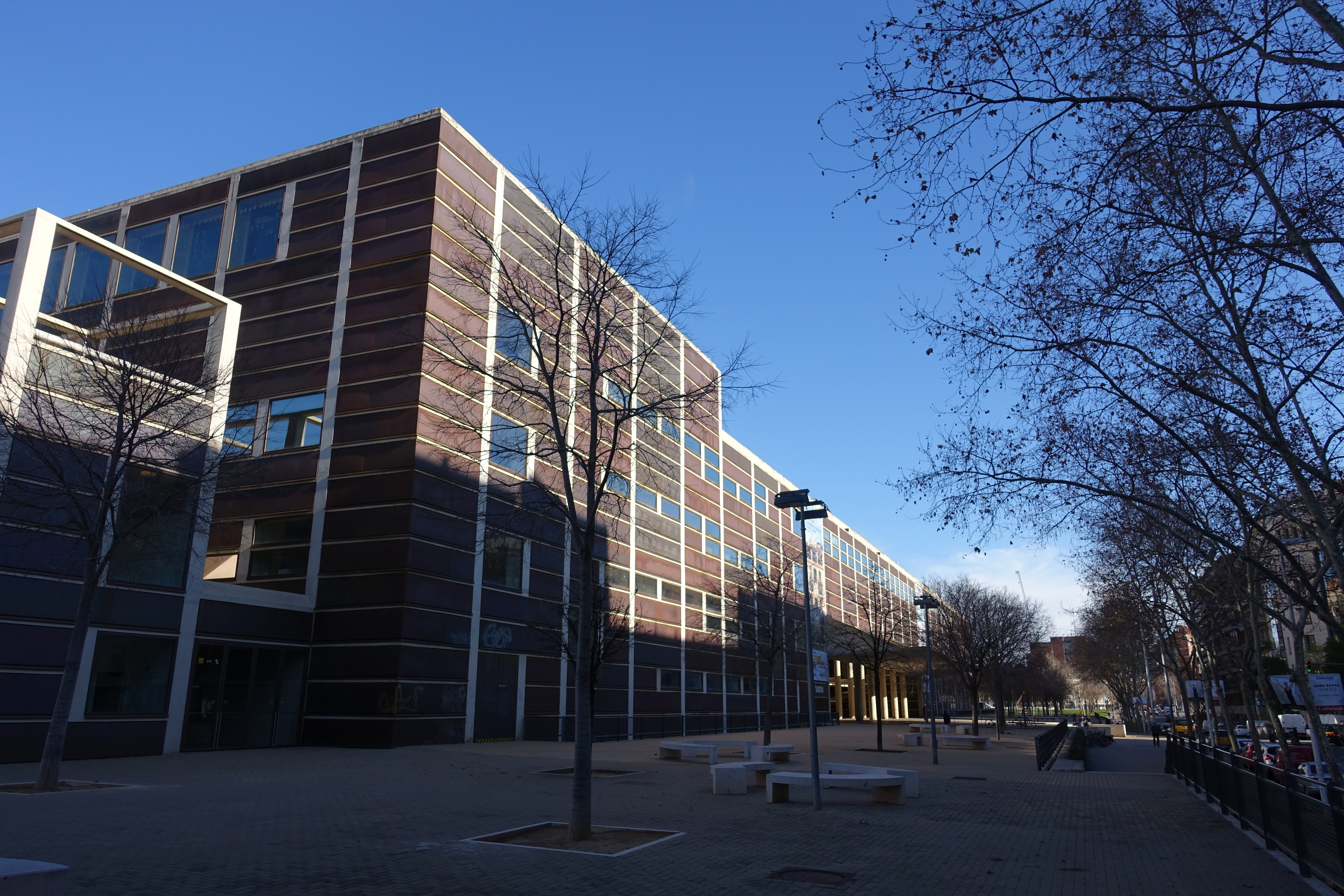
Catalonia College of Music

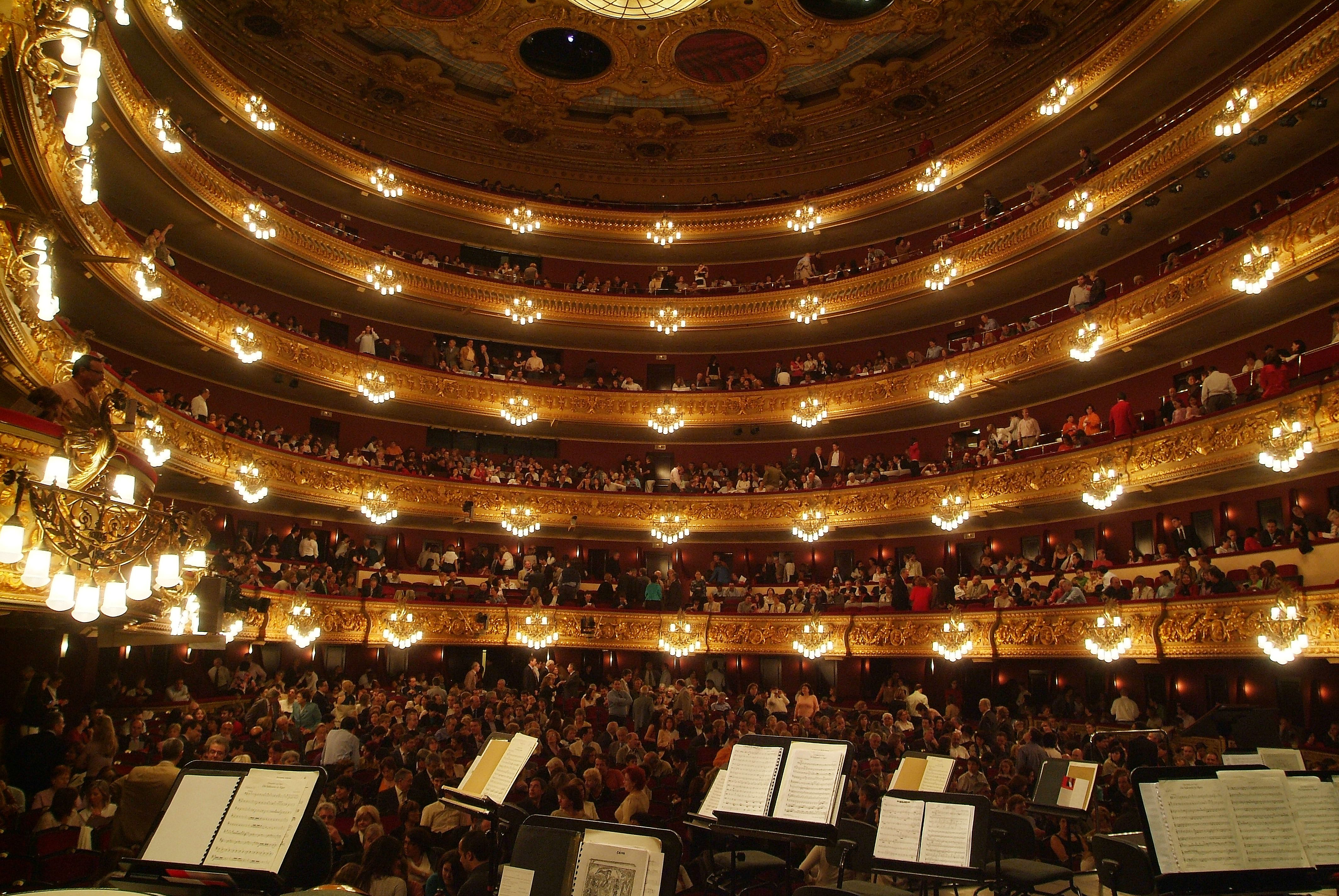
Gran Teatre del Liceu, the auditorium

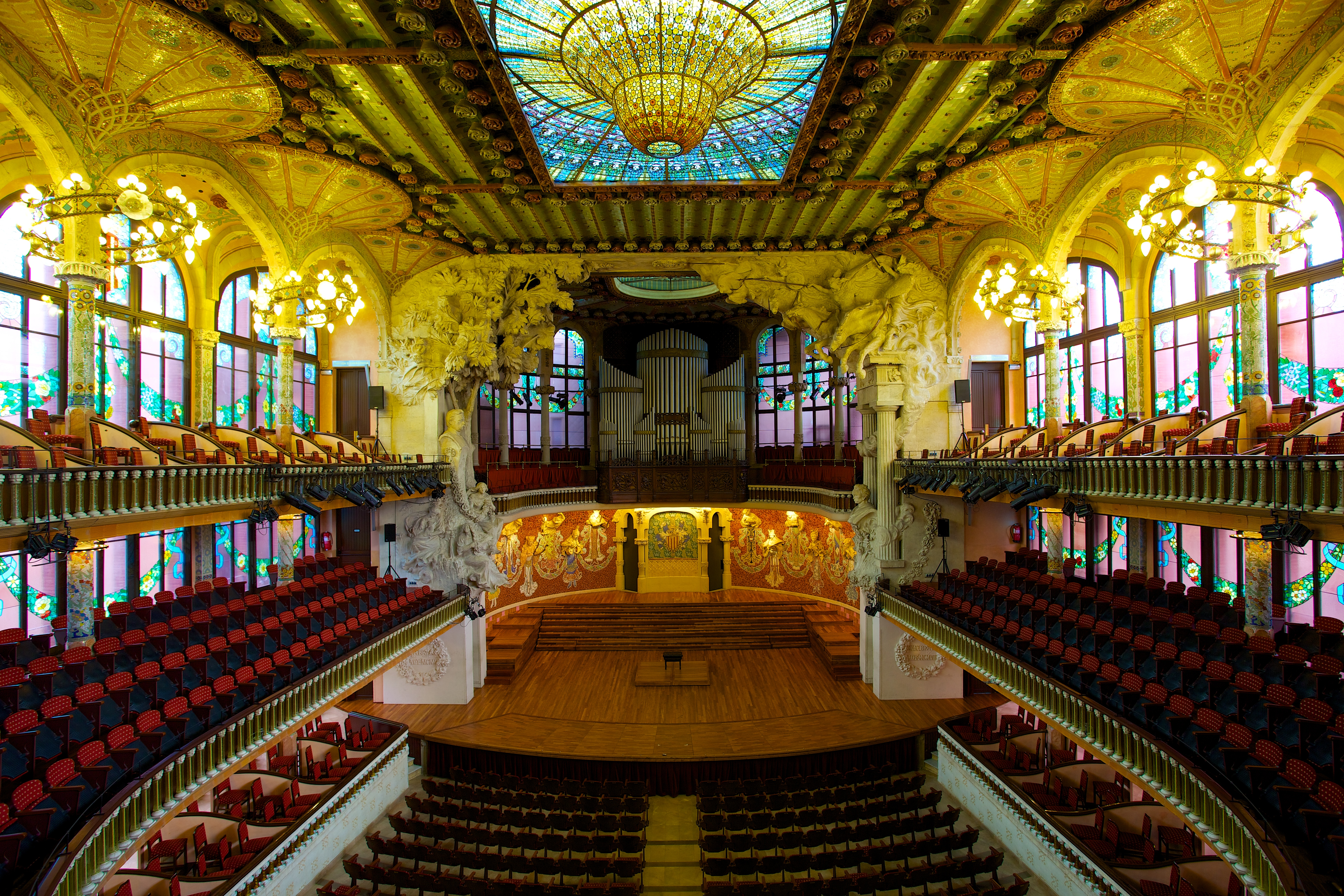
The auditorium of Palau de la Música Catalana

Music of Barcelona

- Music festivals and competitions in Barcelona
  - Barcelona Beach Festival
  - Primavera Sound
  - Sónar
- Music schools in Barcelona
  - Catalonia College of Music
  - Conservatori Superior de Música del Liceu
  - Municipal Conservatory of Barcelona
- Music venues in Barcelona
  - L'Auditori
  - Liceu
  - Palau de la Música Catalana
- Musical ensembles in Barcelona
  - Barcelona Guitar Orchestra
  - Barcelona Symphony and Catalonia National Orchestra
  - Orquestra Simfònica del Gran Teatre del Liceu
- Musicians from Barcelona
  - Leonardo Balada
  - Carlos Surinach
- Songs about Barcelona
  - Barcelona

==== Theatre of Barcelona ====
Theatre in Barcelona

==== Visual arts of Barcelona ====
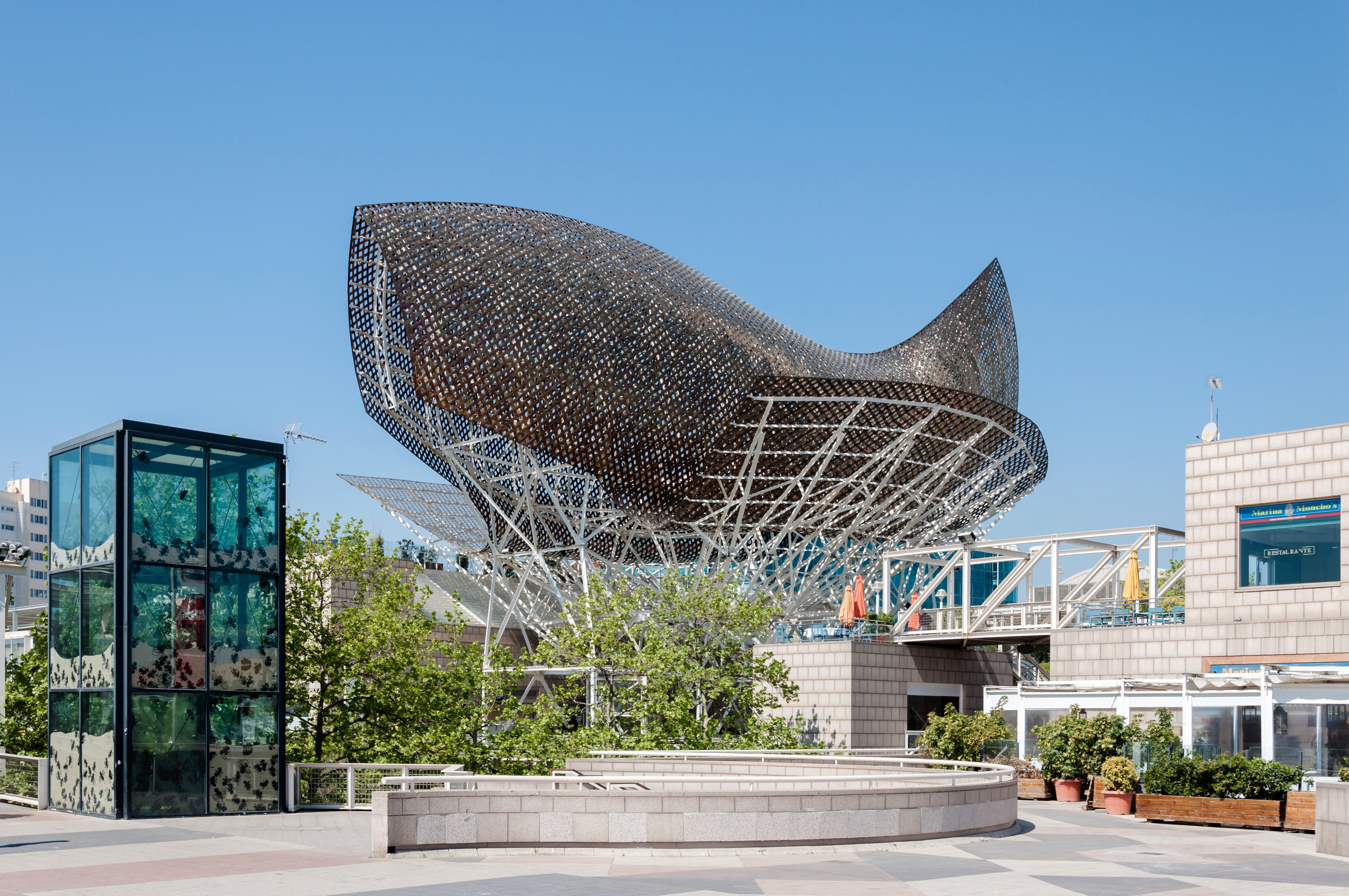
El Peix (1992) by Frank Gehry, Passeig Marítim de la Barceloneta

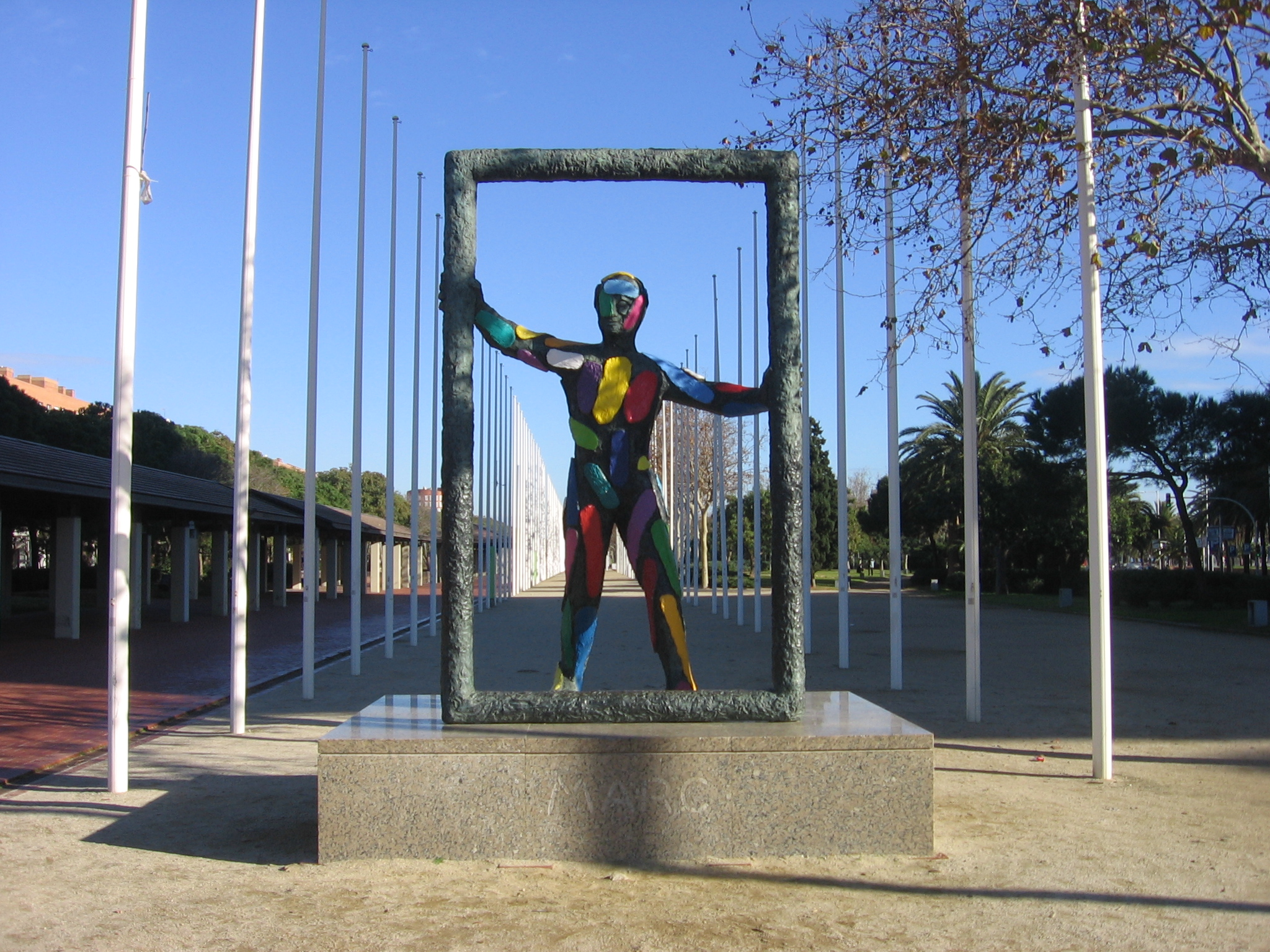
Marc (1997) by Robert Llimós, Parc del Port Olímpic

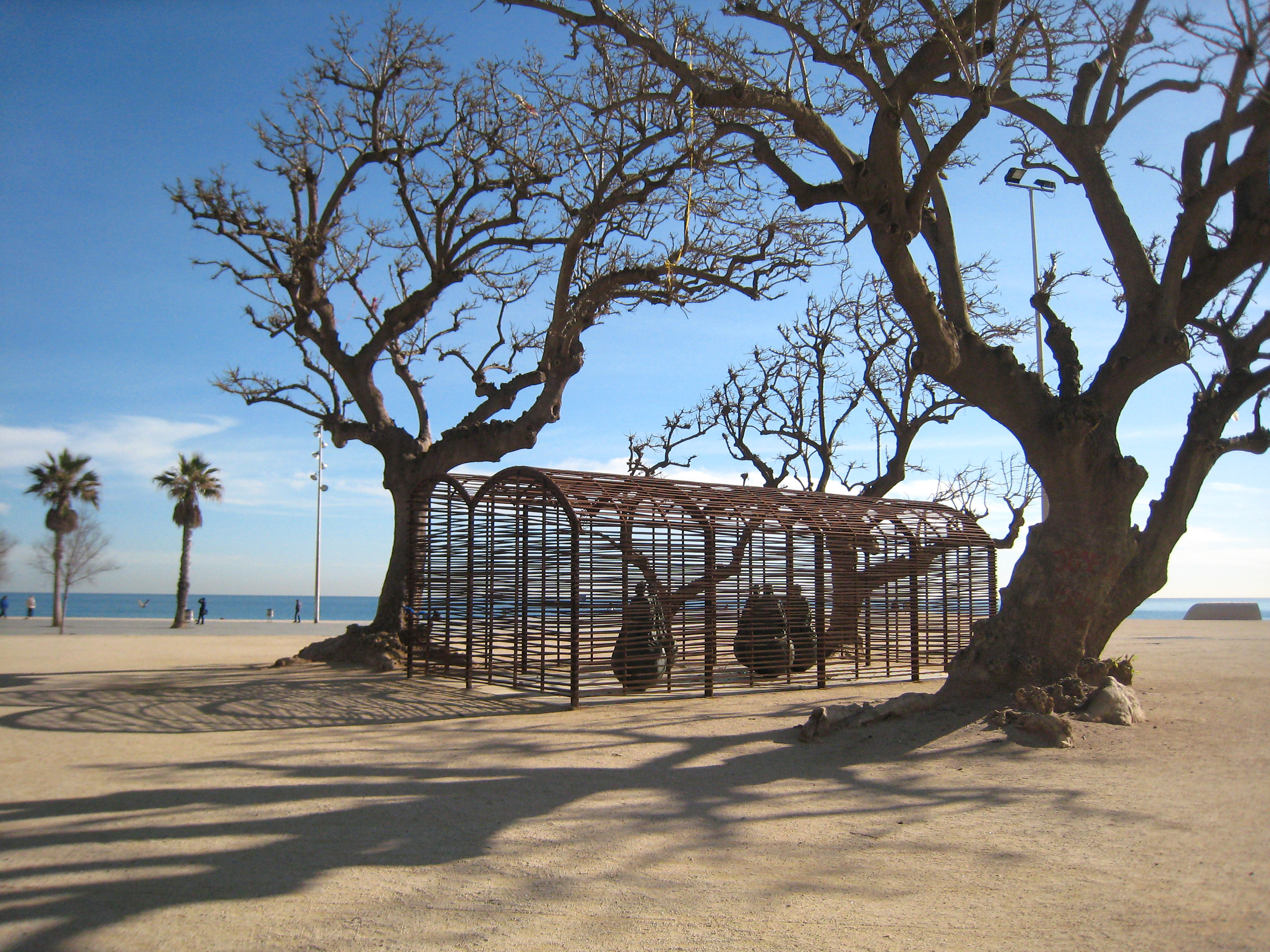
Una habitació on sempre plou (1992) by Juan Muñoz, Plaça del Mar

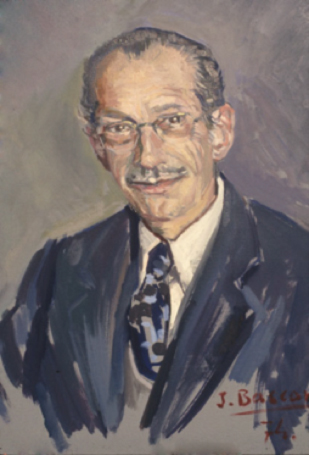
Jose Barraquer, ophthalmologist and pioneer of refractive surgery, born in Barcelona in 1916

Art in Barcelona

- Public art in Barcelona
  - Dona i Ocell
  - El Cap de Barcelona
  - The Caress of a Bird
  - Topos V

Cuisine of Barcelona

- Mató de Pedralbes

Events in Barcelona

- 1888 Barcelona Universal Exposition
- 1929 Barcelona International Exposition
- 2004 Universal Forum of Cultures
- Catalonia April Fair
- Fira de Barcelona
- Mobile World Congress

Fashion in Barcelona

- Fashion in Barcelona
  - The Brandery

Festivals in Barcelona

- Festival Grec de Barcelona
- La Mercè

Languages of Barcelona

- Spanish
- Catalan

Media in Barcelona

- Newspapers in Barcelona
  - La Vanguardia
  - El Periódico de Catalunya
- Radio and television in Barcelona
  - Televisió de Catalunya

People from Barcelona

- People from Barcelona
  - Jose Barraquer
  - Estanislao Figueras
  - Joan Miró
  - Romà Ribera

=== Religion in Barcelona ===
Religion in Barcelona

=== Sports in Barcelona ===
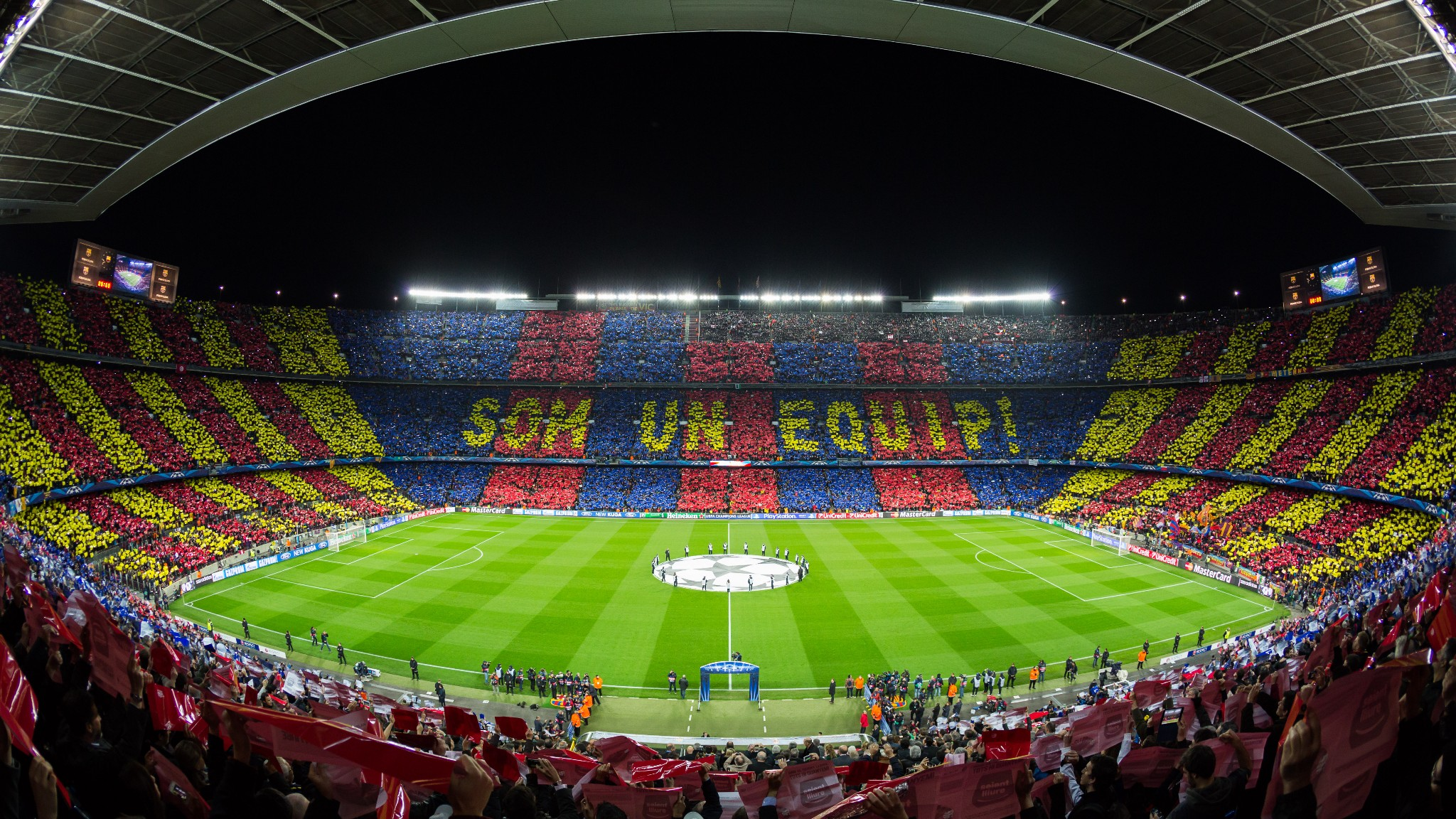
Camp Nou, the largest stadium in Spain and Europe

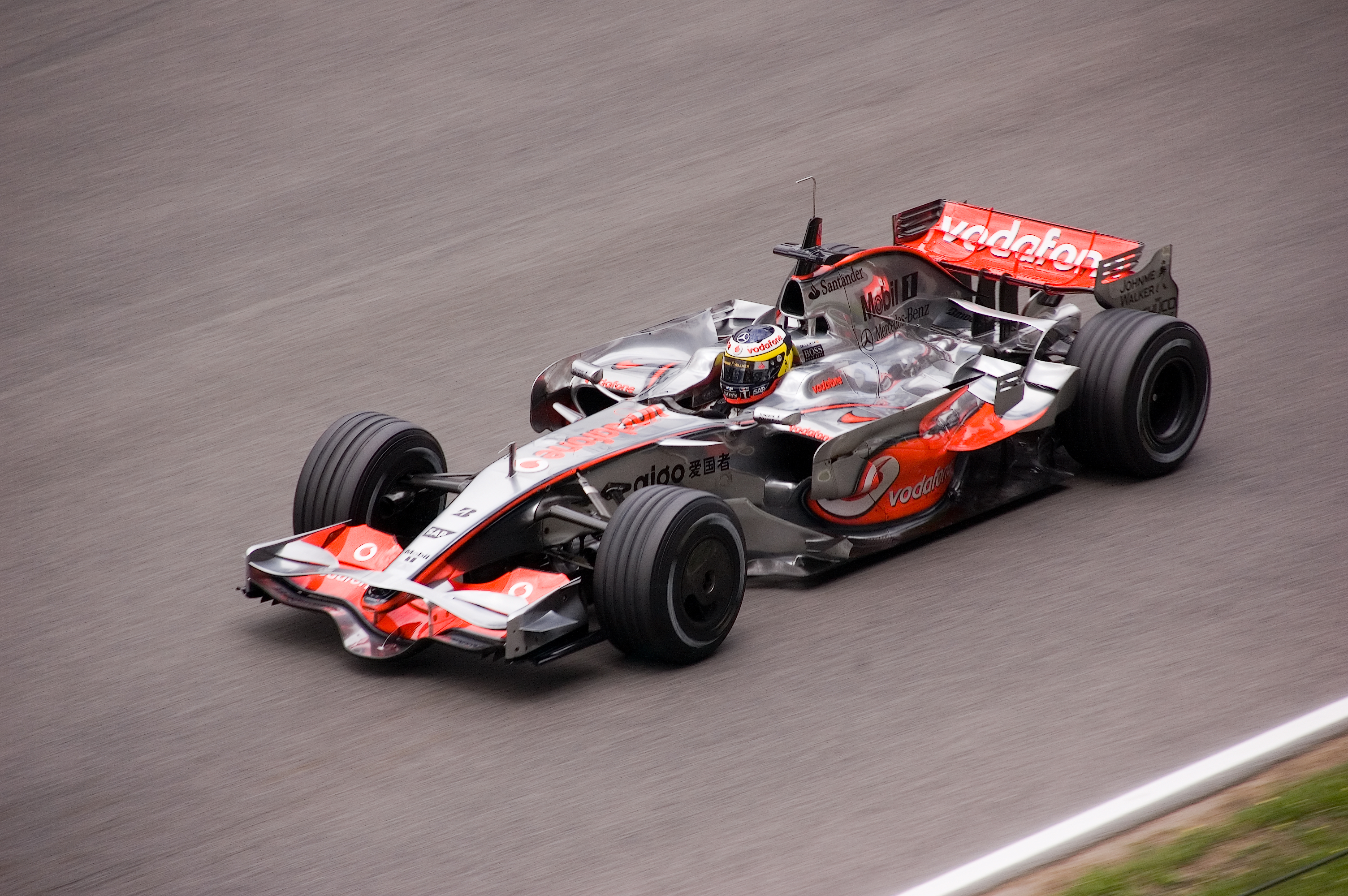
Pedro de la Rosa, a native of Barcelona, testing for McLaren at the Circuit de Barcelona-Catalunya in 2008

Palau Sant Jordi, the largest indoor arena in Spain

Sport in Barcelona

- Football in Barcelona
  - Association football in Barcelona
    - Football teams in Barcelona
      - FC Barcelona
      - RCD Espanyol
- Rugby football in Barcelona
  - FC Barcelona Rugby
- Ice hockey in Barcelona
  - FC Barcelona Ice Hockey
- Sports competitions in Barcelona
  - 1992 Summer Olympics
  - Barcelona Marathon
  - Barcelona Open
  - Barcelona World Race
- Sports venues in Barcelona
  - Camp Nou
  - Circuit de Barcelona-Catalunya
  - Estadi Olímpic Lluís Companys
  - Nou Palau Blaugrana
  - Palau Blaugrana
  - Palau de Gel
  - Palau dels Esports de Barcelona
  - Palau Sant Jordi
  - Piscina Municipal de Montjuïc
  - Real Club de Polo de Barcelona
  - Real Club de Tenis Barcelona
  - Tennis de la Vall d'Hebron
  - Velòdrom d'Horta

== Economy and infrastructure of Barcelona ==
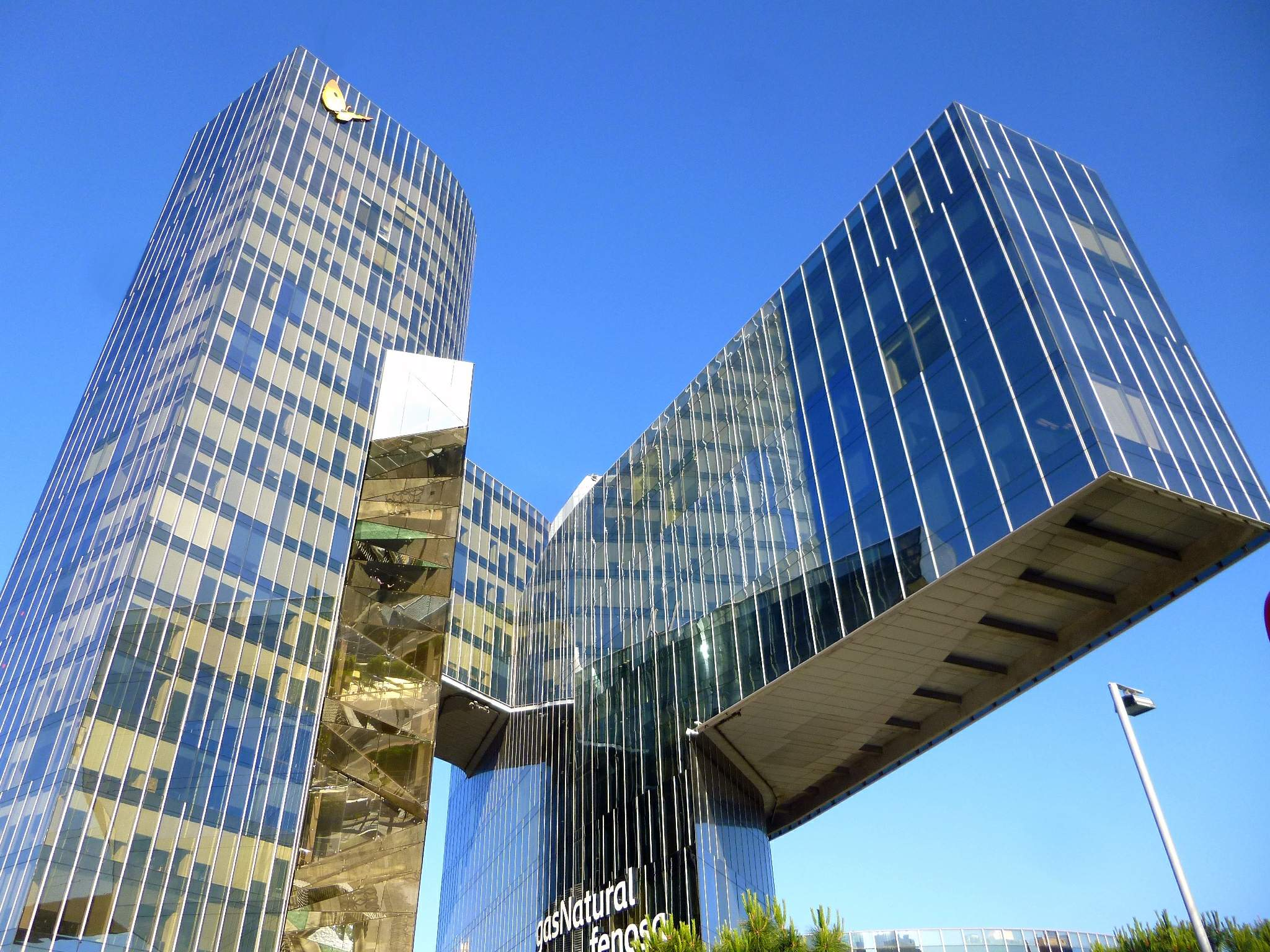
Edifici Gas Natural, the headquarters building of the Naturgy company

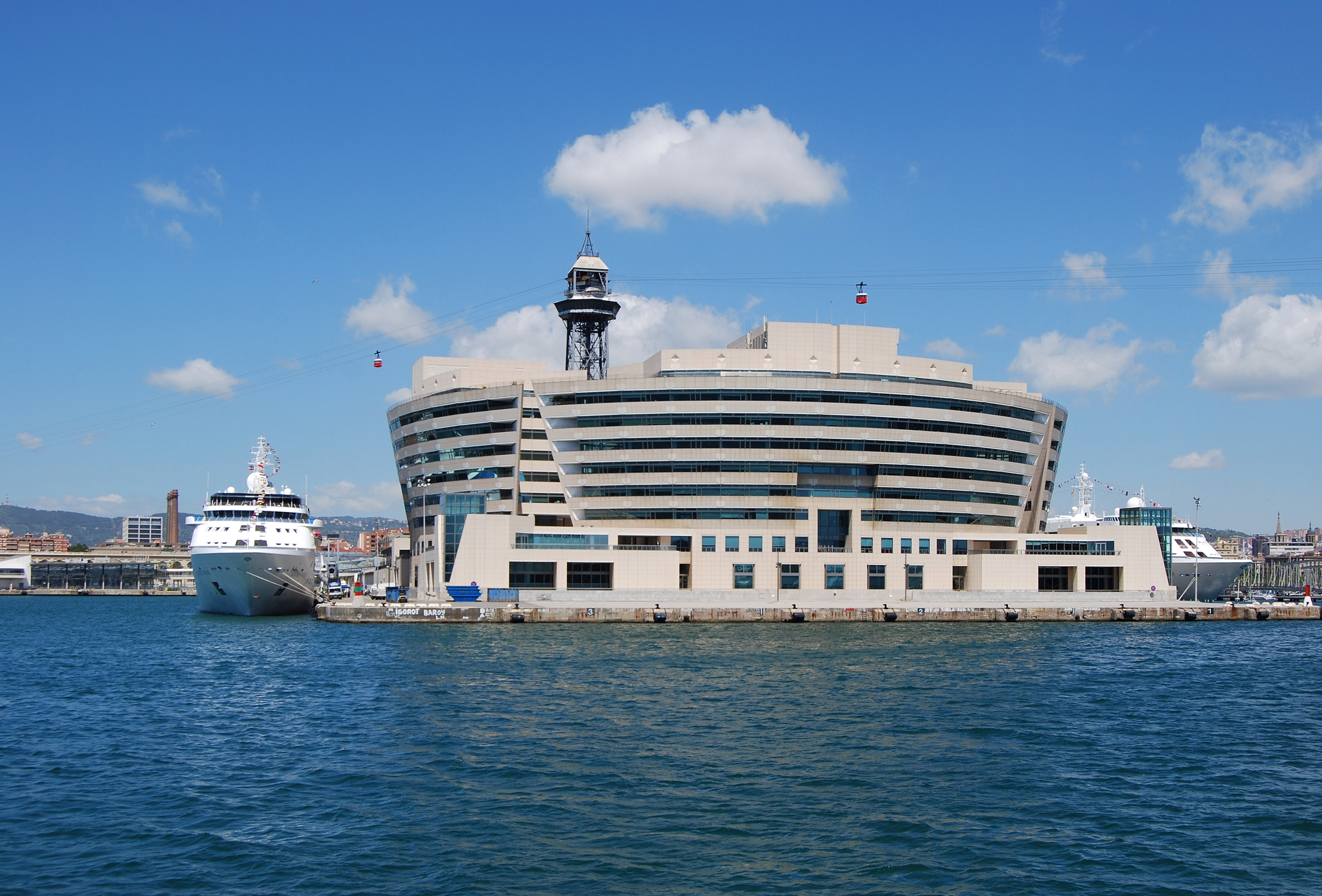
The World Trade Center Barcelona

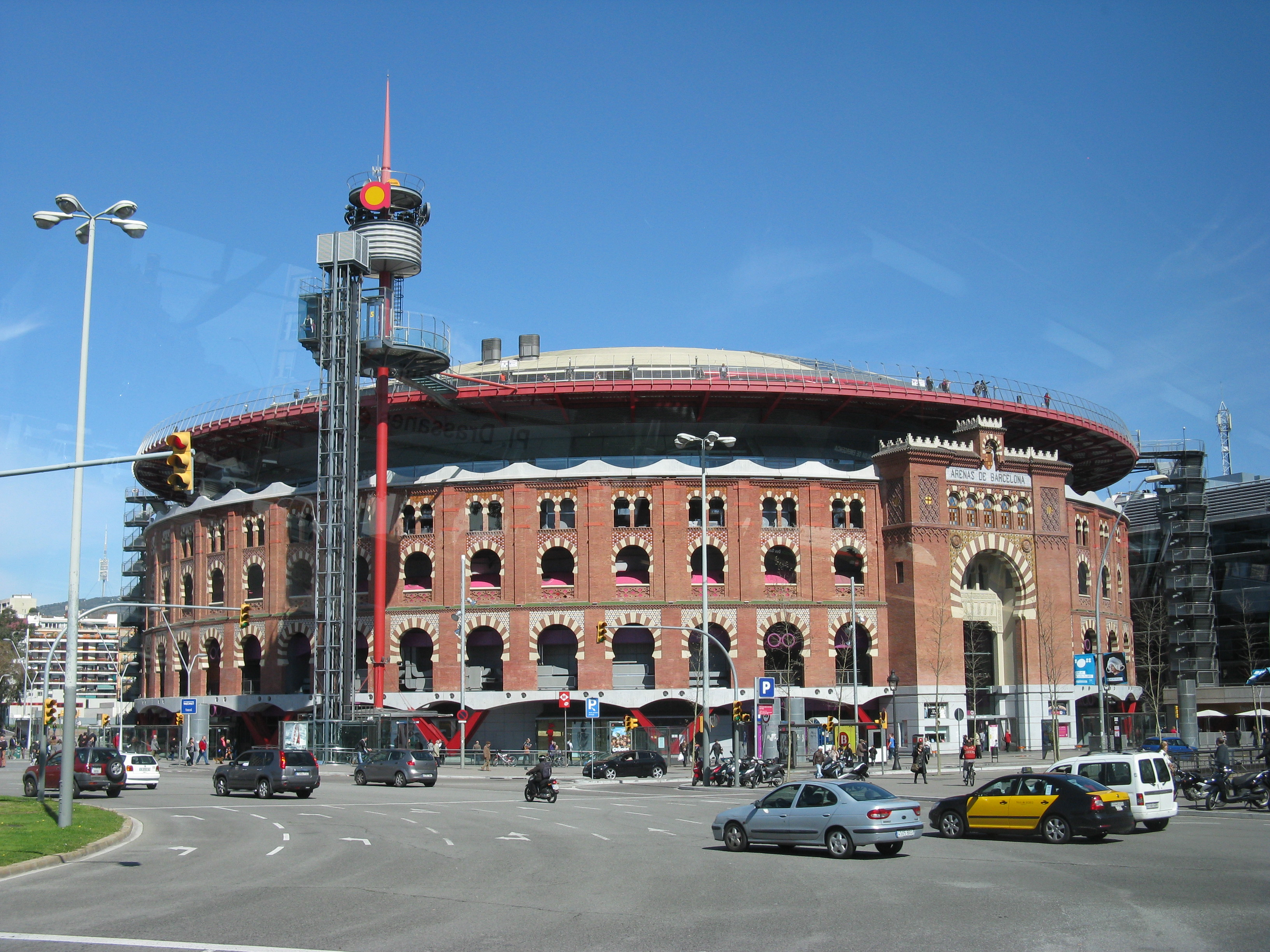
Arenas de Barcelona shopping mall

Economy of Barcelona

- Business parks in Barcelona
  - World Trade Center Barcelona
- Companies in Barcelona
  - Naturgy
- Financial services in Barcelona
  - Bolsa de Valores de Barcelona
  - CaixaBank
- Hotels and resorts in Barcelona
  - Hilton Barcelona
  - Hotel Arts
  - Hotel Porta Fira
  - Hotel Princesa Sofia
  - Renaissance Barcelona Fira Hotel
  - W Barcelona
- Restaurants and cafés in Barcelona
  - Restaurants in Barcelona
    - Lasarte
    - Els Quatre Gats
    - Via Veneto
- Shopping malls and markets in Barcelona
  - La Boqueria
  - Mercat del Born
  - Arenas de Barcelona
- Tourism in Barcelona
  - Tourist attractions in Barcelona
    - La Rambla

=== Transportation in Barcelona ===
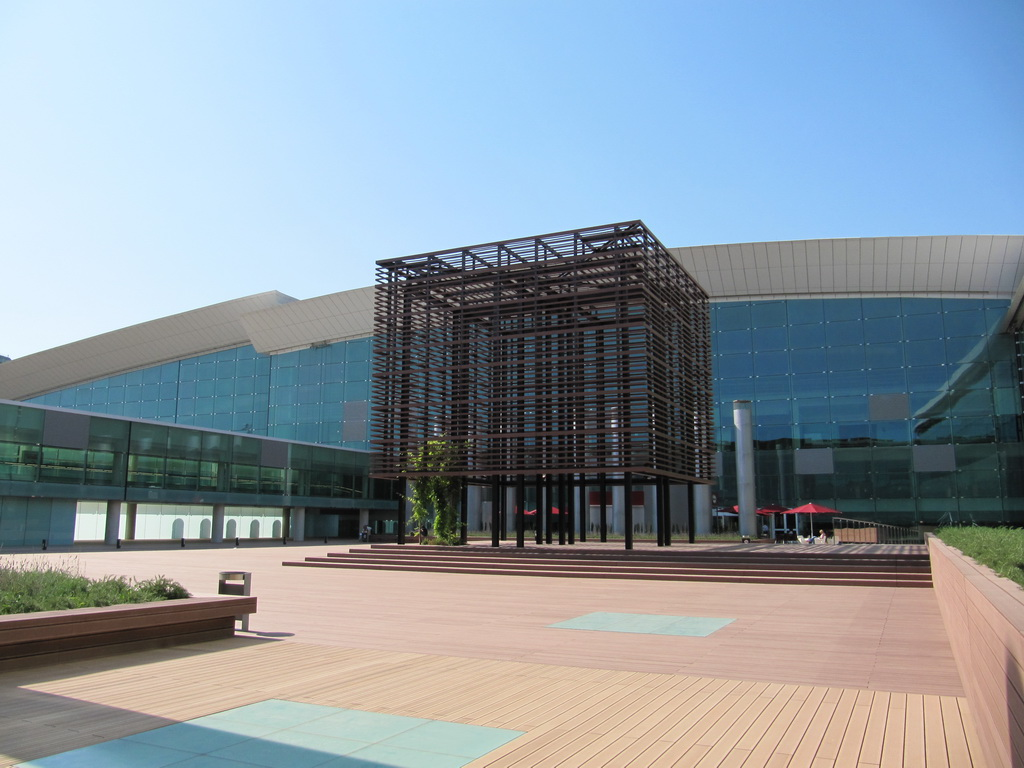
Barcelona–El Prat Airport, the new Terminal 1

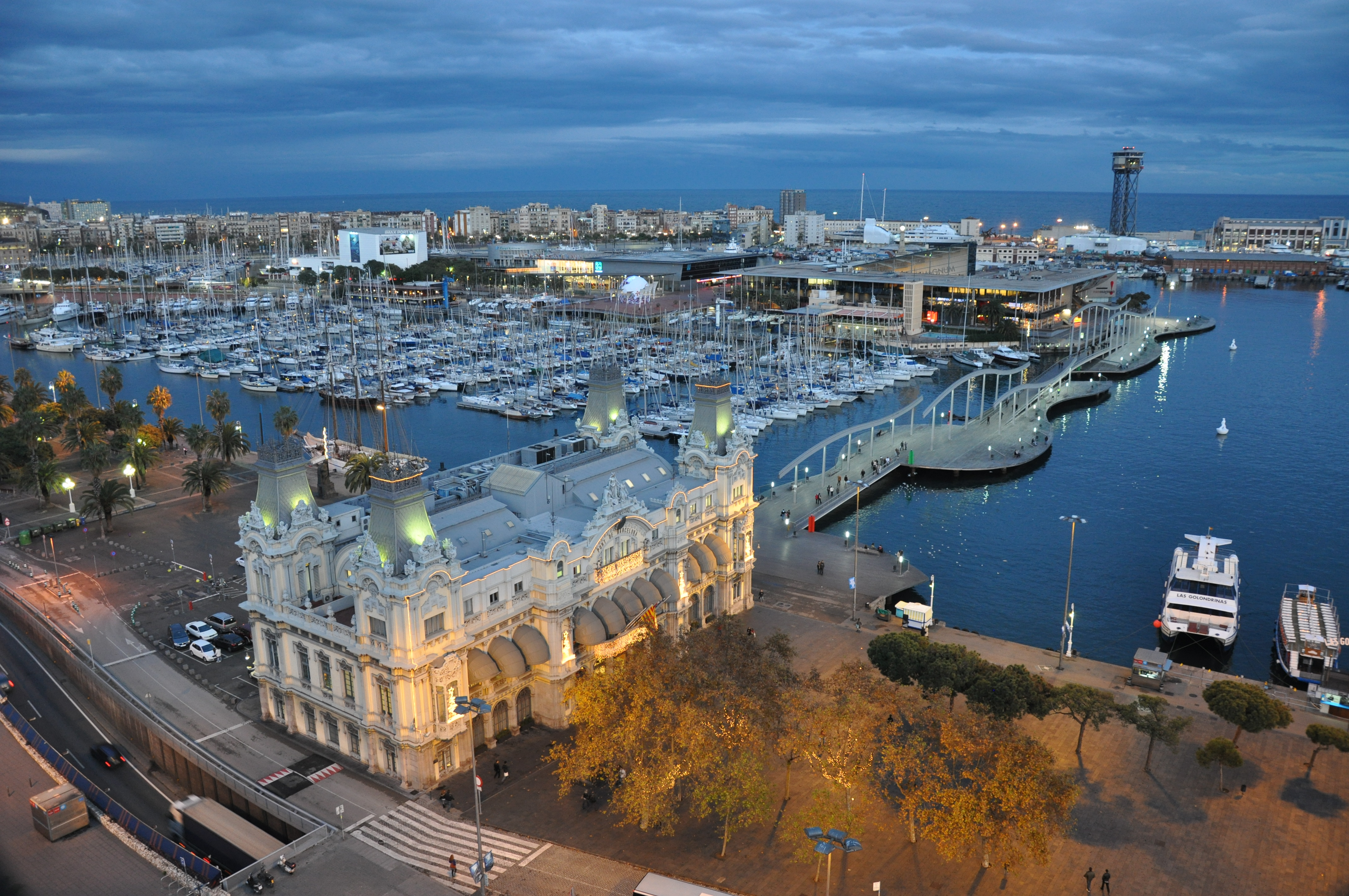
Port Vell, a waterfront harbour in Barcelona, part of the Port of Barcelona

Transport in Barcelona

- Air transport in Barcelona
  - Airports in Barcelona
    - Barcelona–El Prat Airport
- Cable transport in Barcelona
  - Montjuïc Cable Car
  - Port Vell Aerial Tramway
- Maritime transport in Barcelona
  - Port of Barcelona
    - Port Vell
  - Port Olímpic
- Road transport in Barcelona
  - Buses in Barcelona
    - Barcelona Tourist Bus
  - Cycling in Barcelona
    - Bicing
  - Roads in Barcelona
    - B-20 motorway

==== Rail transport in Barcelona ====
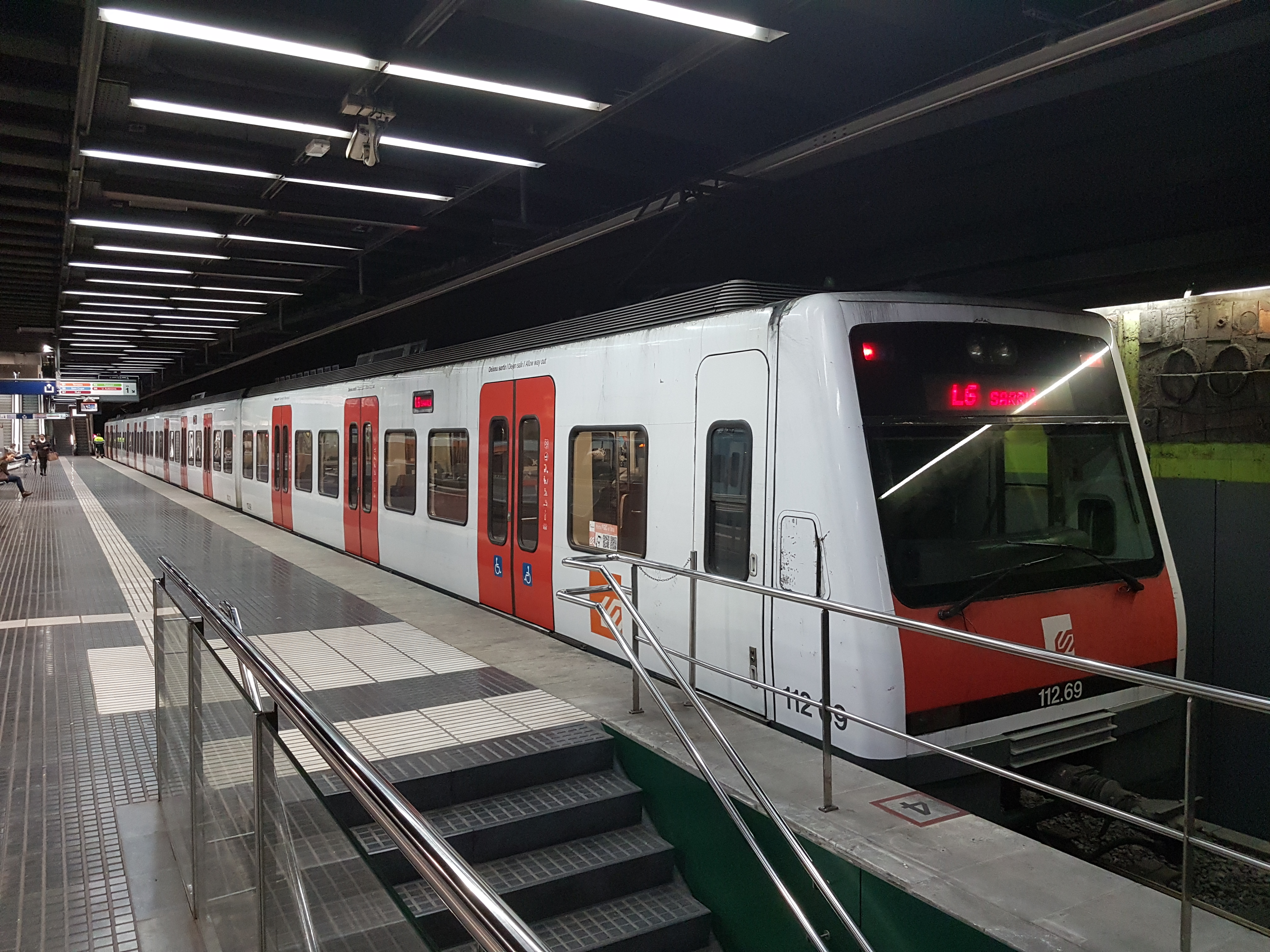
Series 112 metro train at Sarrià station

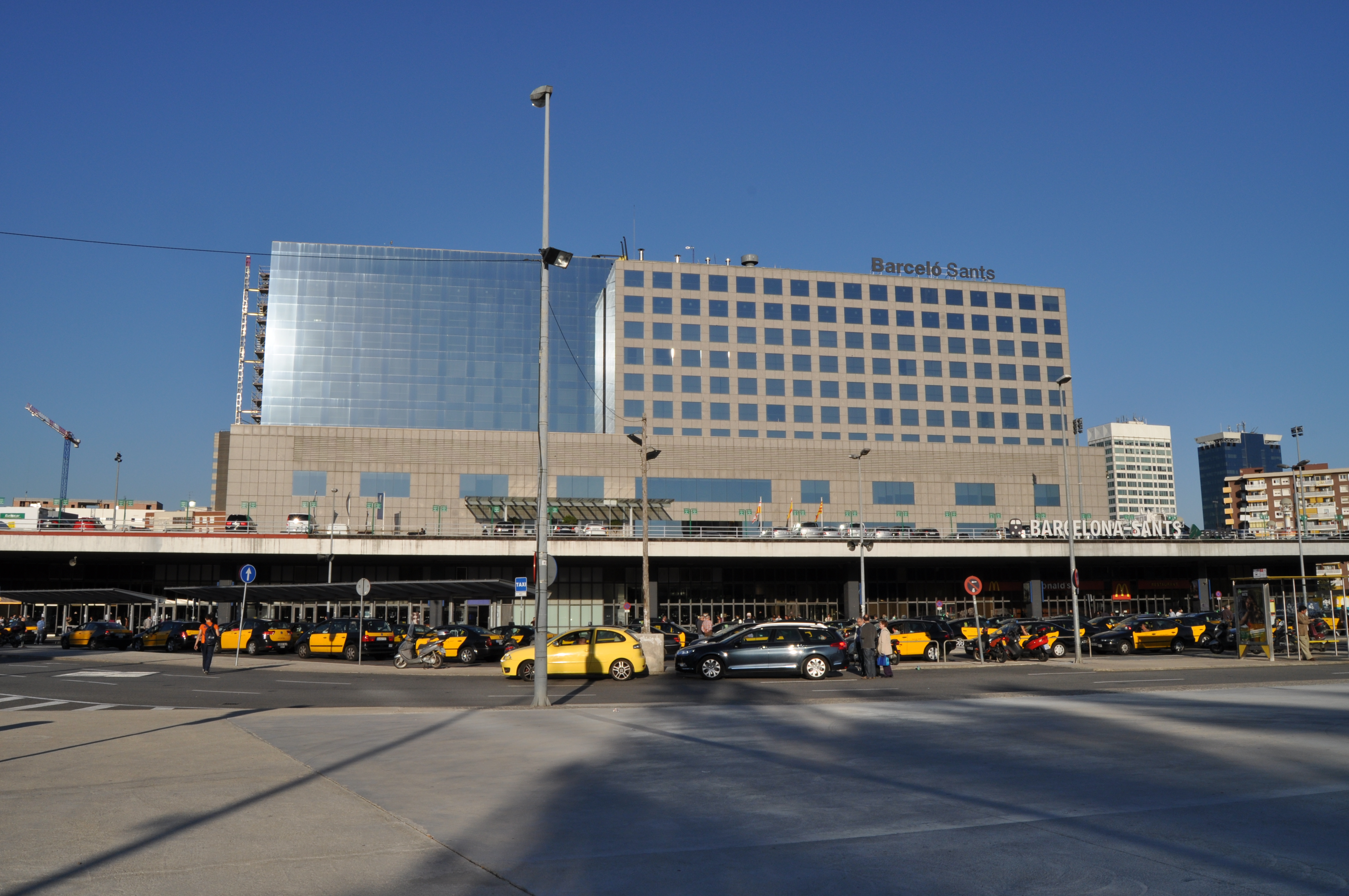
Barcelona Sants, the main railway station in Barcelona

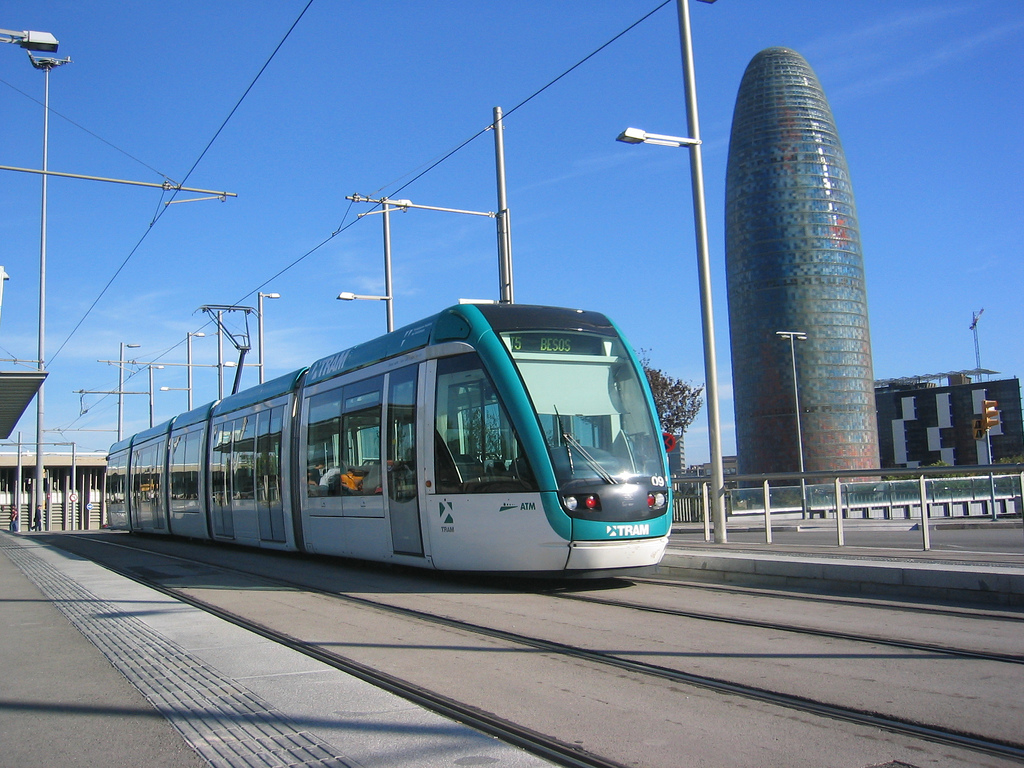
Trambesòs route T5, the Glòries tram stop

Rail transport in Barcelona

- Barcelona Metro
  - Lines
  - Stations
    - List of disused Barcelona Metro stations
- Funicular railway
  - Montjuïc Funicular
  - Tibidabo Funicular
  - Vallvidrera Funicular
- Railway stations in Barcelona
  - Barcelona França railway station
  - Barcelona Sants railway station
- Trams in Barcelona
  - Trambaix
  - Trambesòs
  - Tramvia Blau
    - Tram stops in Barcelona

== Education in Barcelona ==
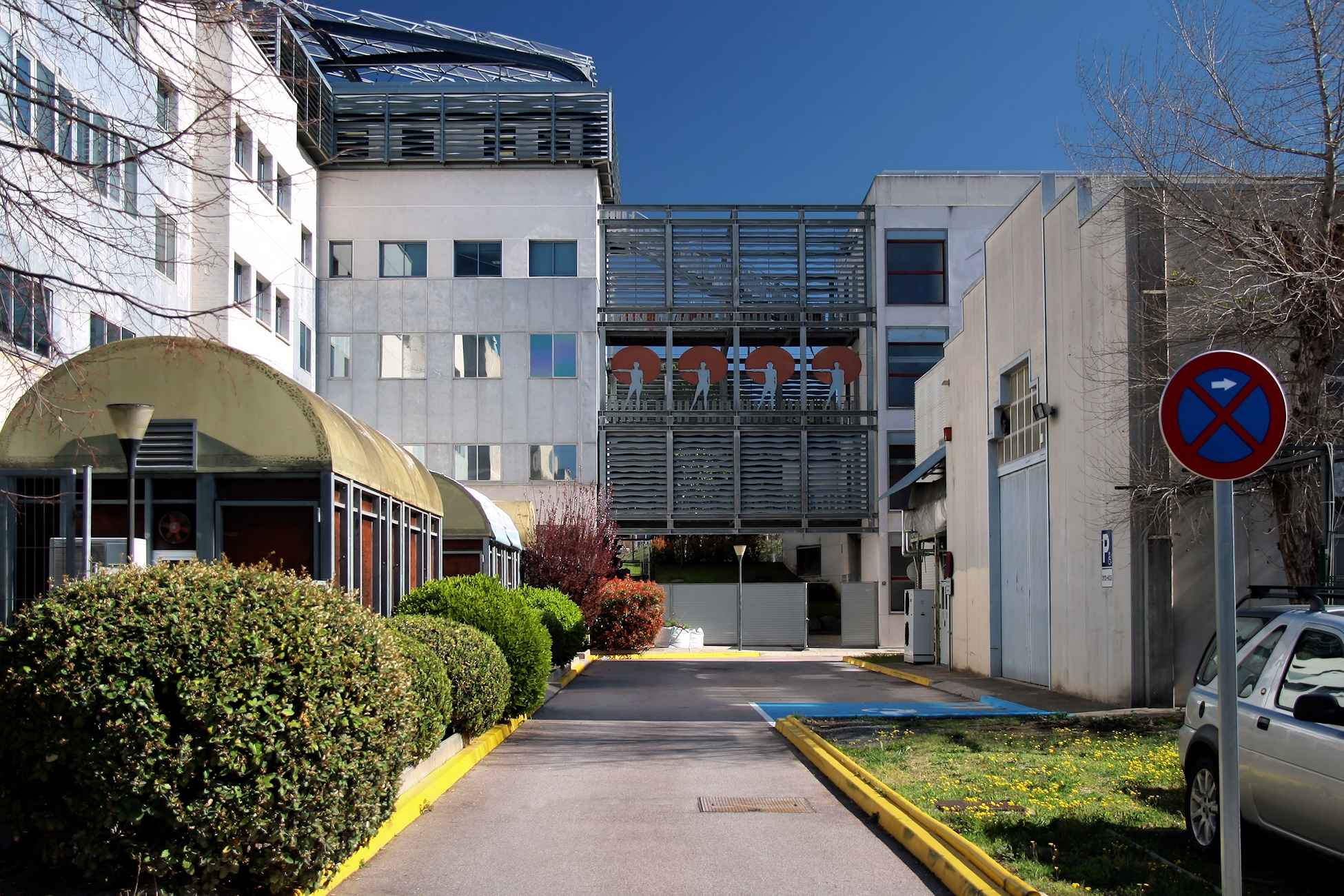
Autonomous University of Barcelona

Education in Barcelona

- Libraries in Barcelona
  - National Library of Catalonia
    - Barcelona Mass
- Universities and colleges in Barcelona
  - Autonomous University of Barcelona
  - Polytechnic University of Catalonia
  - Pompeu Fabra University
  - Ramon Llull University
  - University of Barcelona
- Research institutes in Barcelona
  - Barcelona Supercomputing Center
  - Institute for Research in Biomedicine

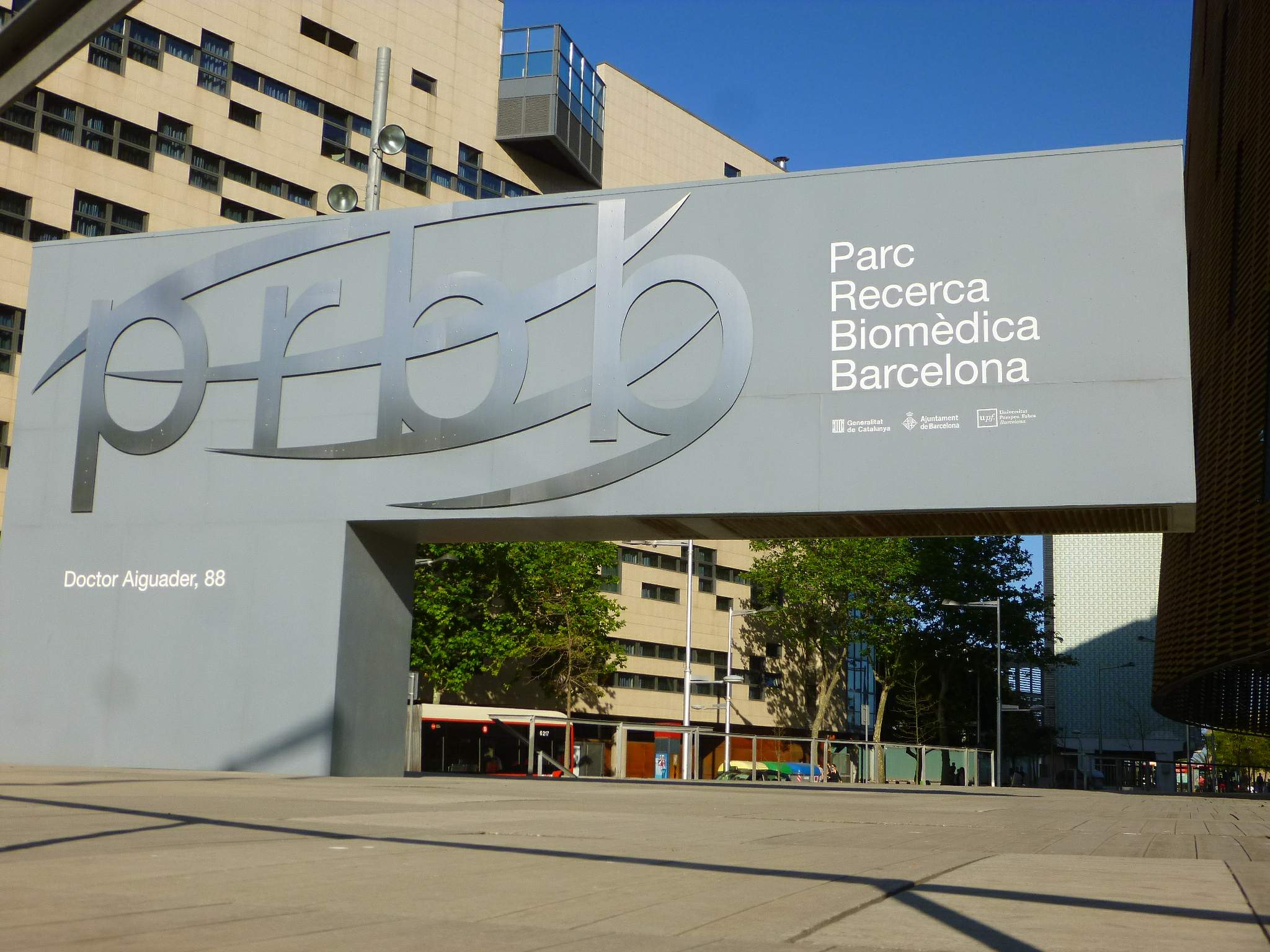
Barcelona Biomedical Research Park

== Healthcare in Barcelona ==
Healthcare in Barcelona

- Hospitals in Barcelona
  - Hospital Sant Joan de Déu Barcelona
- Research centres in Barcelona
  - Barcelona Biomedical Research Park

== See also ==
- Outline of geography
