= Topos (disambiguation) =

A topos (plural topoi or toposes) is a type of category in mathematics.

Topos may also refer to:

== Mathematics ==
- Elementary topos, a generalization of Grothendieck topos used in logic

== Philosophy, rhetoric and literature ==
- Rhetoric topos, topoi in rhetorical invention
- Literary topos, topoi in literary theory
- Topical logic, reasoning from commonplace topoi
- Topos hyperuranionos, Platonic realm of archetypes

== Other ==
- Los Topos, California theatre troupe
- Oo-Topos, interactive science-fiction game
- Topos Bookstore Cafe, a used bookstore and cafe in New York City
- Topo (climbing) (plural topos), description of a climbing route
- Topos de Reynosa FC, a Mexican football club
- Topos de Tlatelolco, a non-for-profit rescue organization based in Mexico
- Topos V, a sculpture by Eduardo Chillida, displayed in Barcelona

== See also ==
- Toos (disambiguation)
- Topo (disambiguation)
