= Topo =

Topo or TOPO may refer to:

- Topo (Calheta), a civil parish in the municipality of Calheta, in the Portuguese archipelago of the Azores
- Topo (climbing), in climbing, a graphical illustration of the line and key topological challenges of a route
- Topo (robot), a robot aimed at the consumer and educational market, produced during the 1980s by Androbot
- Topography or topographic map
- Trioctylphosphine oxide, abbreviated as TOPO
- TOPO cloning, in genetics
- Los Topos, a 1970s California theatre group, one of whose members was also known as Topo
- Topo (DC Comics), a fictional character in the Aquaman series
- Topo Gigio, a popular Italian puppet character, made famous by appearances on The Ed Sullivan Show
- Topos de Tlatelolco, an earthquake and natural disaster search and rescue squad from Mexico
- Topo, a genus of comb-footed spiders
- Topo, nickname of San Sebastián Metro

El Topo may refer to:

- El Topo, 1970 Mexican film
- El Topo (Puerto Rican singer/songwriter), stage name for Antonio Caban Vale
- El Topo (criminal), Ecuadorian criminal and gang leader

== See also ==
- Topophilia
- Topol (disambiguation)
- Topos (disambiguation)
- Toppo (disambiguation)
