= Topos V =

Coordinates: 41.3840°N 2.1774°E

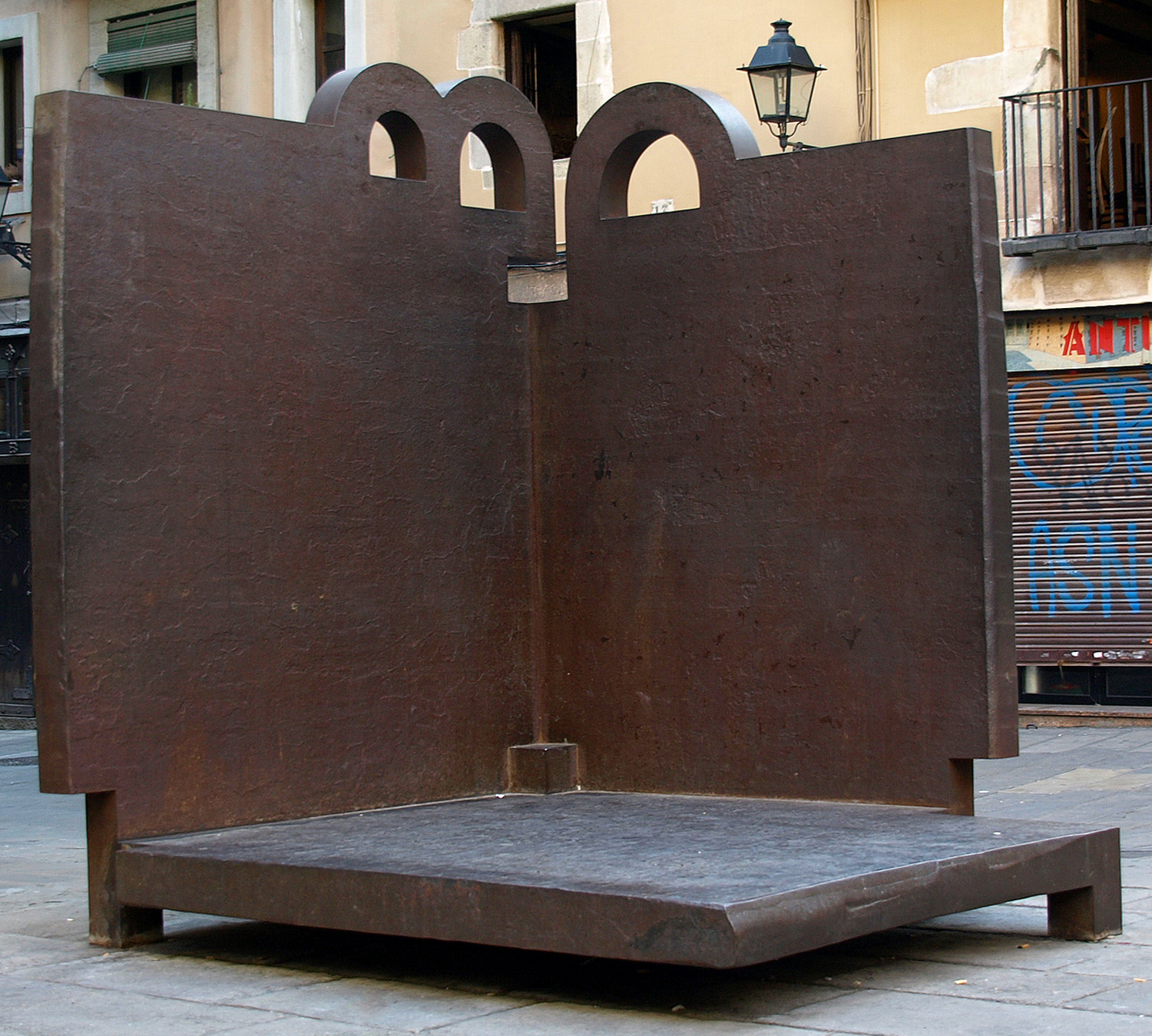
Eduardo Chillida's Topos V.

Topos V, or simply Topos, is a sculpture by the Basque artist Eduardo Chillida, from 1986, standing at Plaça del Rei in the Gothic Quarter of Barcelona.

Purchased by Barcelona municipality when it was exhibited at Joan Miró Foundation in 1986, the artist itself suggested that the best placement for this sculpture would be Plaça del Rei, where its geometrical shapes, scale, brown color and textures could dialogue with the sober mediaeval architecture surrounding the square, including historical buildings such as Palau Real Major, the Royal chapel of Saint Agatha and Padellàs's House.

Topos V is cast in iron. Its geometrical shape reproduces a Dihedral angle, closed on two of its sides. The two open sides face the square. In addition, some round shaped forms that could evoke the B, for "Barcelona", and medieval arches or windows as well, complete the elements allowing a perfect complementarity between contemporary sculpture and medieval architecture.

Its dimensions are 2.10 × 2.37 × 1.70 metres.

== Bibliography ==
- Capó, Jaume y Catasús, Aleix. Barcelona Esculturas. Editions Polígrafa-City council of Barcelona, 2001. ISBN 84-343-0979-3

== See also ==
- Public art of Barcelona
