= Padella (disambiguation) =

Padella may refer to:

- Bella di padella, a 2004 album by Italian musician Francesco Facchinetti under the name DJ Francesco
- Emanuele Padella (born 1988), Italian footballer
- Panhandle 38, a 1972 Italian film also known as Padella calibro 38
- Yponomeuta padella, a moth also known as the orchard ermine or the cherry ermine

== See also ==
- Casa Padellàs, a Gothic palace in Barcelona, Spain
