= Temple of Augustus, Barcelona =

Roman temple in Barcelona, Spain

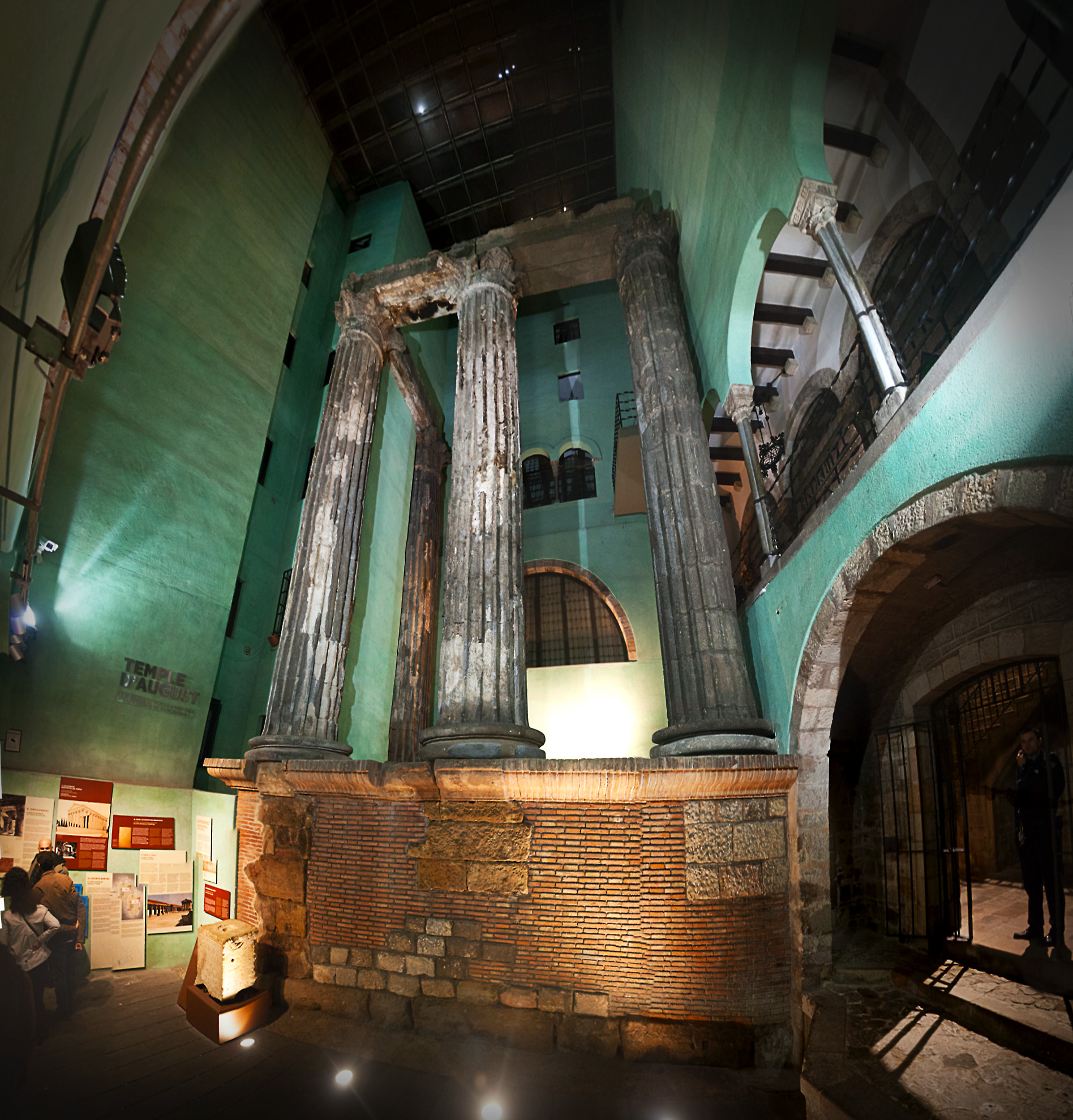
The remaining columns of the Temple of Augustus

The Temple of Augustus in Barcelona was a Roman temple built during the Imperial period in the colony of Barcino (modern day Barcelona). The temple was the central building on Tàber Hill, currently in Carrer del Paradís number 10, in the city's so-called Gothic Quarter. The dedication to Augustus is traditional, but unproven.

== Archaeology ==
If still in use by the fourth century AD, the temple would have been closed during the persecution of pagans under the Christian emperors. At some point the temple was demolished, and its ruins were not discovered until the late 19th century, when three of its columns appeared on the construction site of Centre Excursionista de Catalunya. A fourth column was then exhibited at the Plaça del Rei and was later added to the structure, as it can be seen nowadays.

According to Josep Puig i Cadafalch, architect Antoni Celles wrote once a complete description and a map of the temple during excavations as early as 1830 financed by the Barcelona Chamber of Commerce. Puig i Cadafalch confirmed Celles's hypothesis that the temple would have been dedicated to Augustus. He also describes it formally as being a peripteral temple with eleven columns on each wing, including corner columns, and with six on the front and further six on the posticum. The whole building would have been 35 x 17.5 metres in size, erected on a podium a third the height of the columns.

It was named a Cultural Asset of National Interest (Catalan: Bé cultural d'interés nacional) in 1931.

The Temple of Augustus is one of the Barcelona City History Museum (MUHBA) heritage sites.

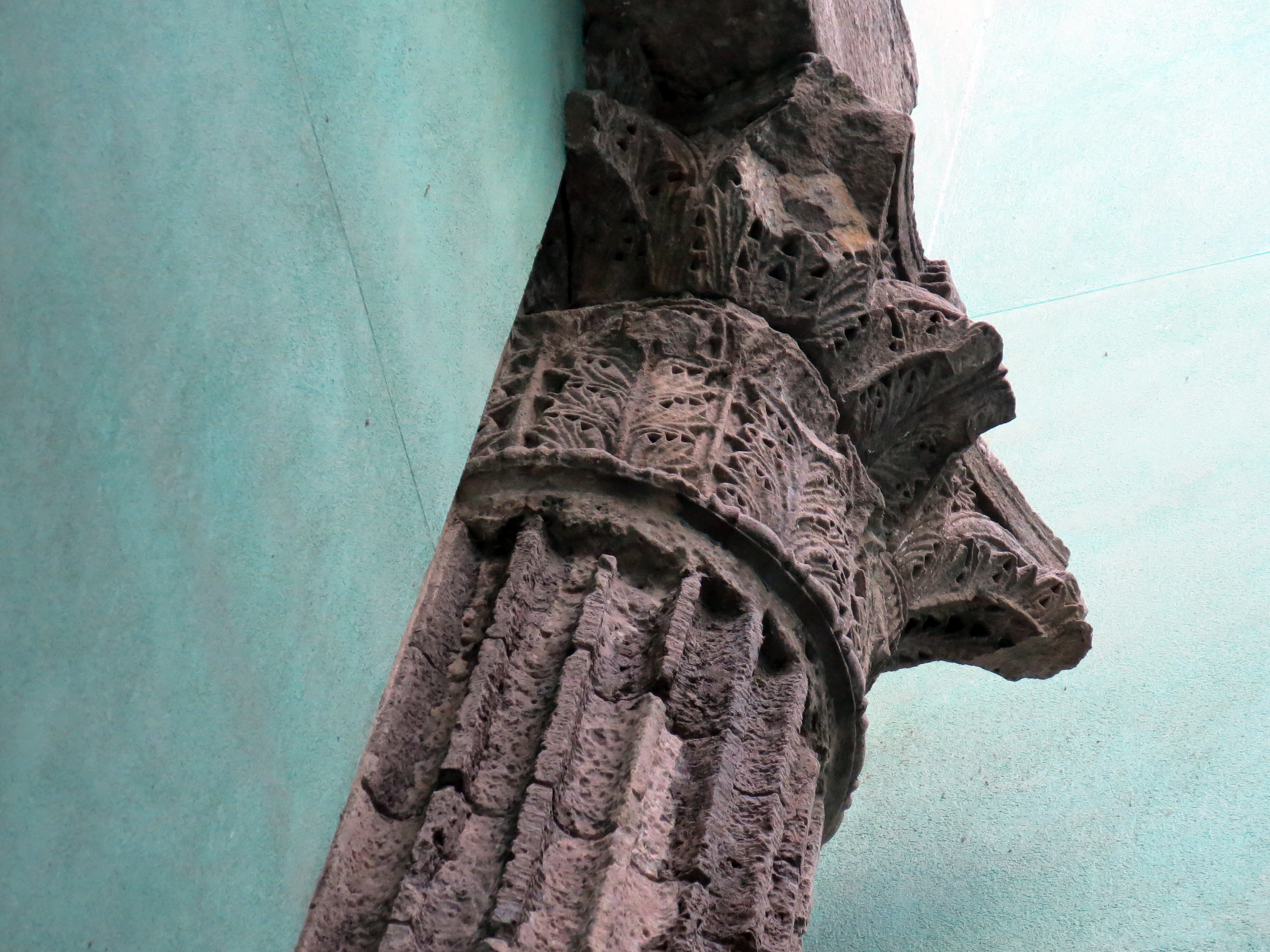

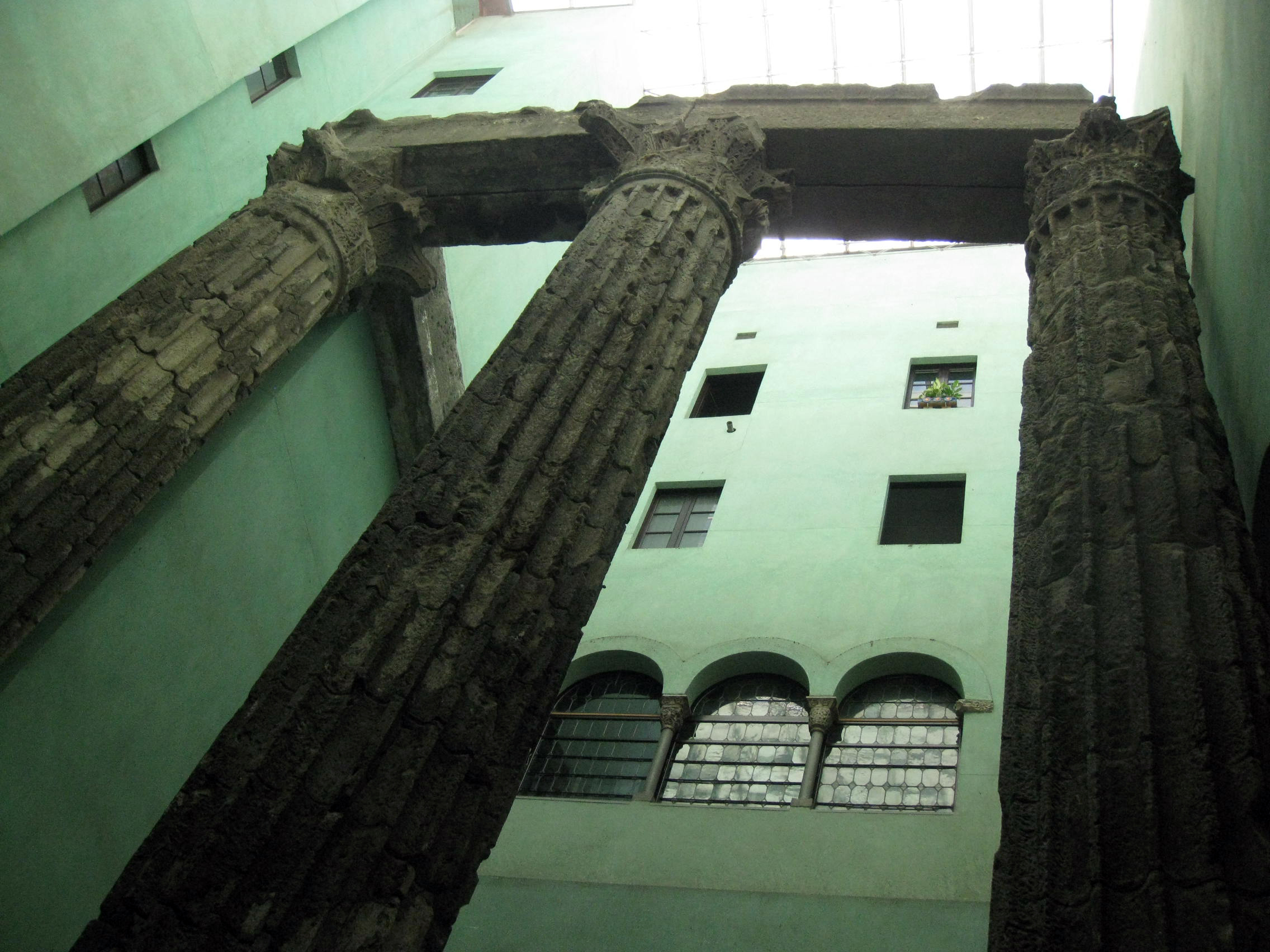

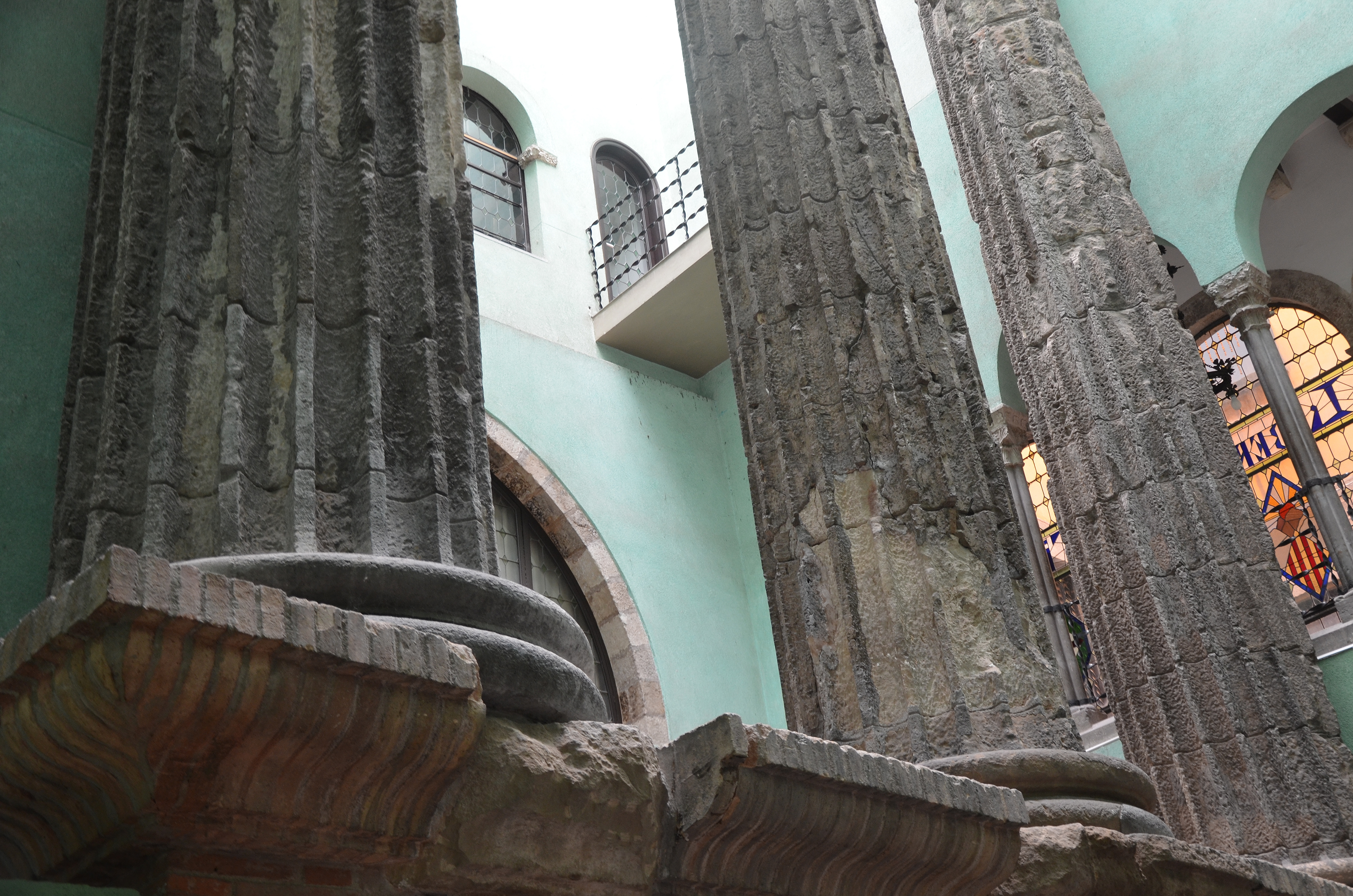

== See also ==
- List of Ancient Roman temples
- Temple of Divus Augustus, Rome
- Temple of Augustus, Pula
- Temple of Augustus, Ancyra
