= Temple of Augustus, Pula =

Roman temple in Pula, Croatia

Temple of Augustus
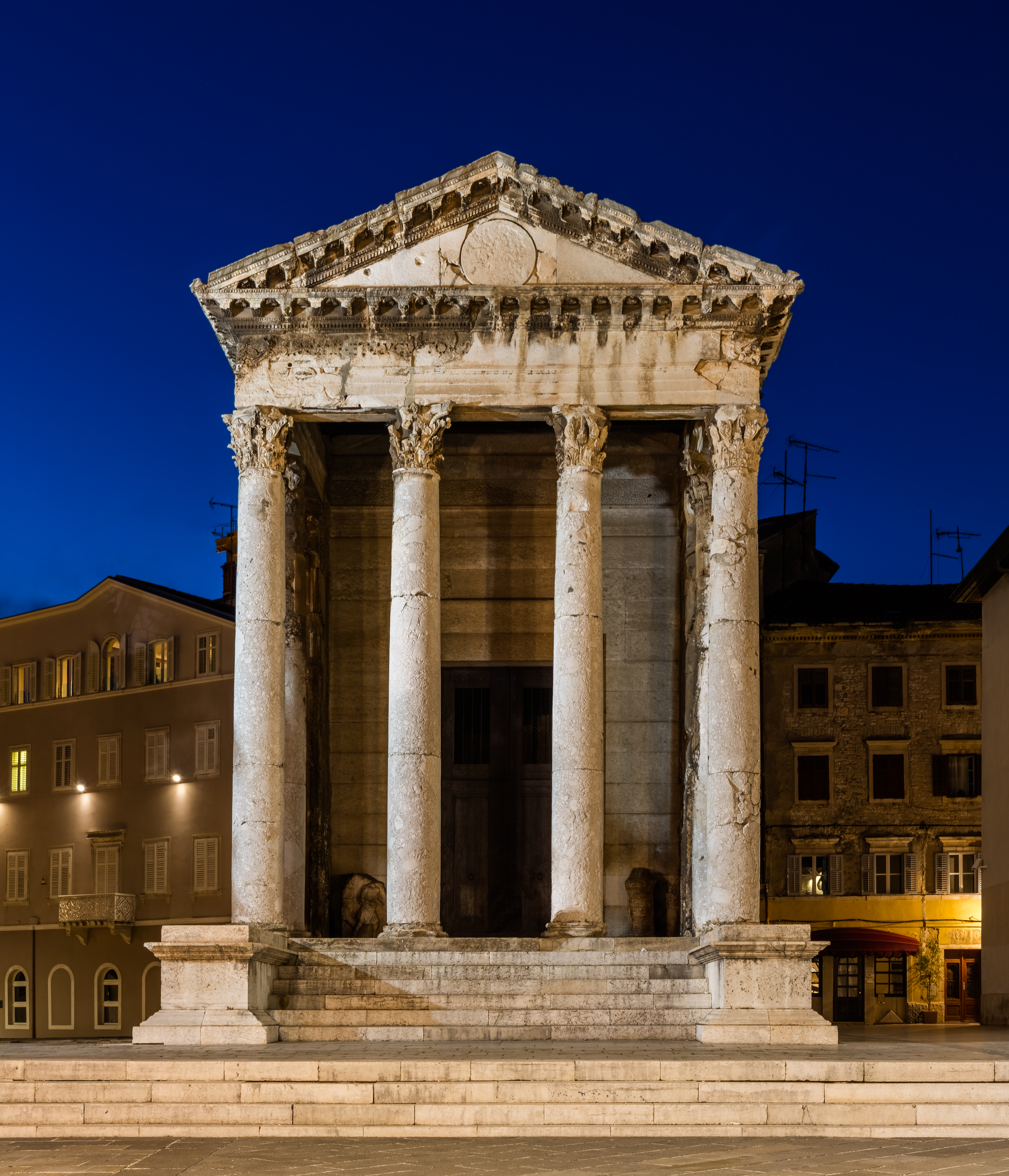
- Interactive map of Temple of Augustus
- Location: Pula, Istria, Croatia
- Coordinates: 44.8702°N 13.8418°E
- Type: Roman temple
- Length: 17.85 metres (58.6 ft)
- Width: 8.05 metres (26.4 ft)
- Height: 14 metres (46 ft)
- Beginning date: c. 2 BC
- Completion date: c. 14 AD
- Dedicated to: Augustus

The Temple of Augustus (Croatian: Augustov hram; Italian: Tempio di Augusto) (Note: Also known as the Temple of Augustus and Roma or the Temple of Rome and Augustus) is a well-preserved Roman temple in the city of Pula, Croatia (known in Roman times as Pietas Iulia). Dedicated to the first Roman emperor, Augustus, it was probably built during the emperor's lifetime at some point between 27 BC and his death in AD 14. It was built on a podium with a tetrastyle prostyle porch of Corinthian columns and measures about 8 by 17.3 m (26 by 57 ft), and 14 m (46 ft) high. The richly decorated frieze is similar to that of a somewhat larger and more recent temple, the Maison Carrée in Nîmes, France. These two temples are considered the two best complete Roman monuments outside Italy.

== History ==
The temple was part of a triad consisting of three temples. The Temple of Augustus stood at the left side of the central temple, and the similar temple of the goddess Diana stood on the other side of the main temple. Although the larger central temple has not survived, the whole back side of the Temple of Diana is still clearly visible due to its incorporation into the Communal Palace, built in 1296.

If still in use by the 4th-century, the temple would have been closed during the persecution of pagans in the late Roman Empire. Under Byzantine rule, the temple was converted into a church, accounting for its survival to modern times, and was later used as a granary.

In the 16th century, Andrea Palladio included the description of the temple in his I quattro libri dell'architettura, a highly influential book on the principles of Classical architecture.

By the late 19th century, the temple stood at the corner of the marketplace of Pula and was partly concealed by houses, "so that the visitor cannot obtain a view till he is close to it."

It was struck by a bomb during an Allied air raid in 1944, almost totally destroying it, but was reconstructed in 1947. It is today used as a lapidarium to display items of Roman sculpture.

=== Dedication ===
The temple's dedication originally consisted of bronze letters affixed by nails to the stones of the architrave. Only the attachment holes now remain and much of the text has been destroyed over time. However, it consisted of a standard dedication also found on other Augustan temples, which read:

ROMAE⸱ET⸱AVGVSTO⸱CAESARI⸱DIVI⸱F⸱PATRI⸱PATRIAE
To Roma and Augustus Caesar, son of the deity, father of the fatherland

or

In honour of Rome and Augustus Caesar, son of the deified [Julius], father of his country.

This indicates that the temple was originally also co-dedicated to the goddess Roma, the personification of the city of Rome. Unlike later temples, such as the Temple of Divus Augustus in Rome, the temple was not dedicated to divus (the deified) Augustus - a title only given to the emperor after his death. This, the title Pater Patriae that was voted to Augustus in 2 BC., and the temple's architectural style, have allowed archaeologists to date the temple to the late Augustan period, prior to Augustus' death in AD 14.

== Gallery ==
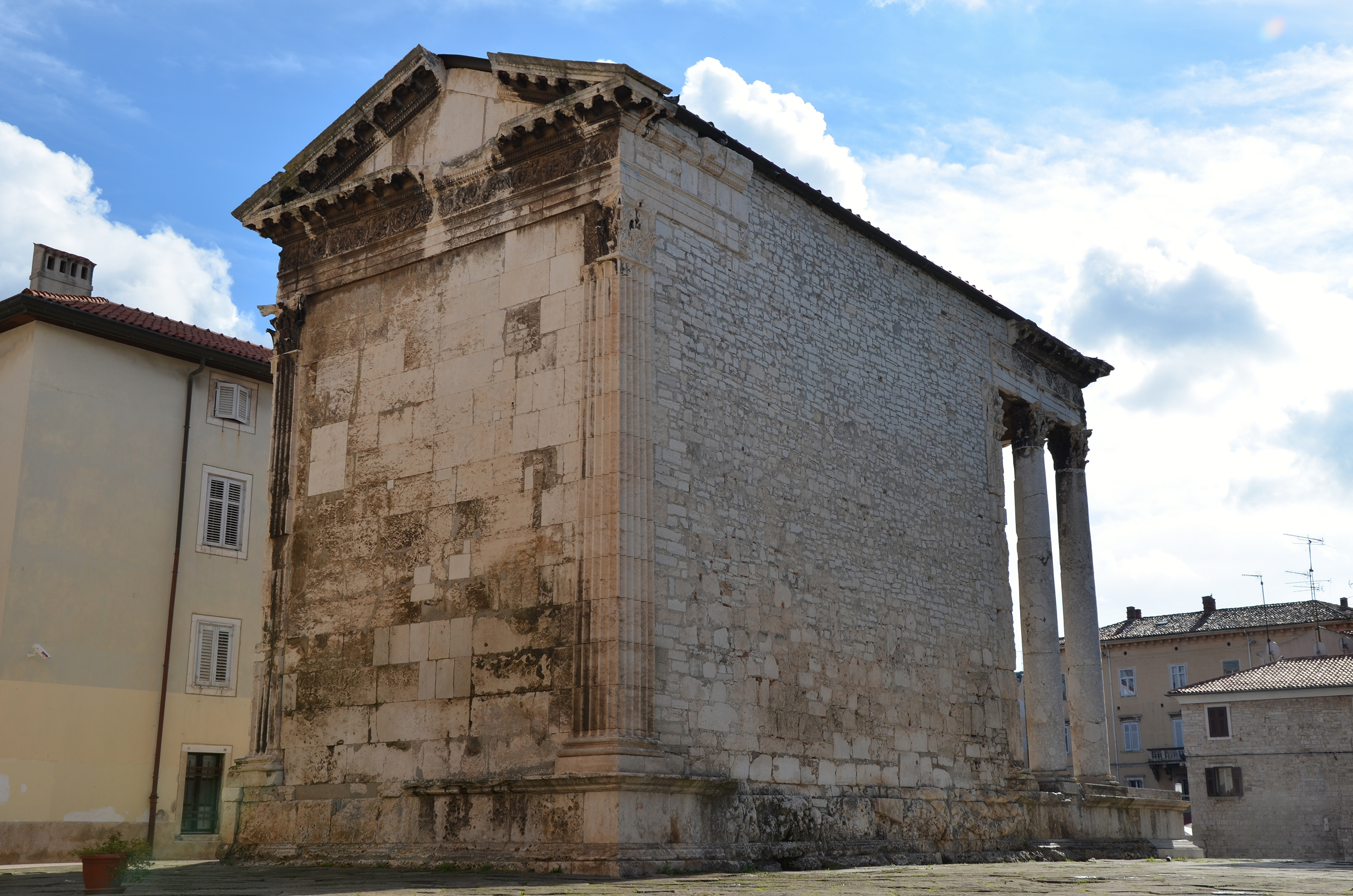
Back view

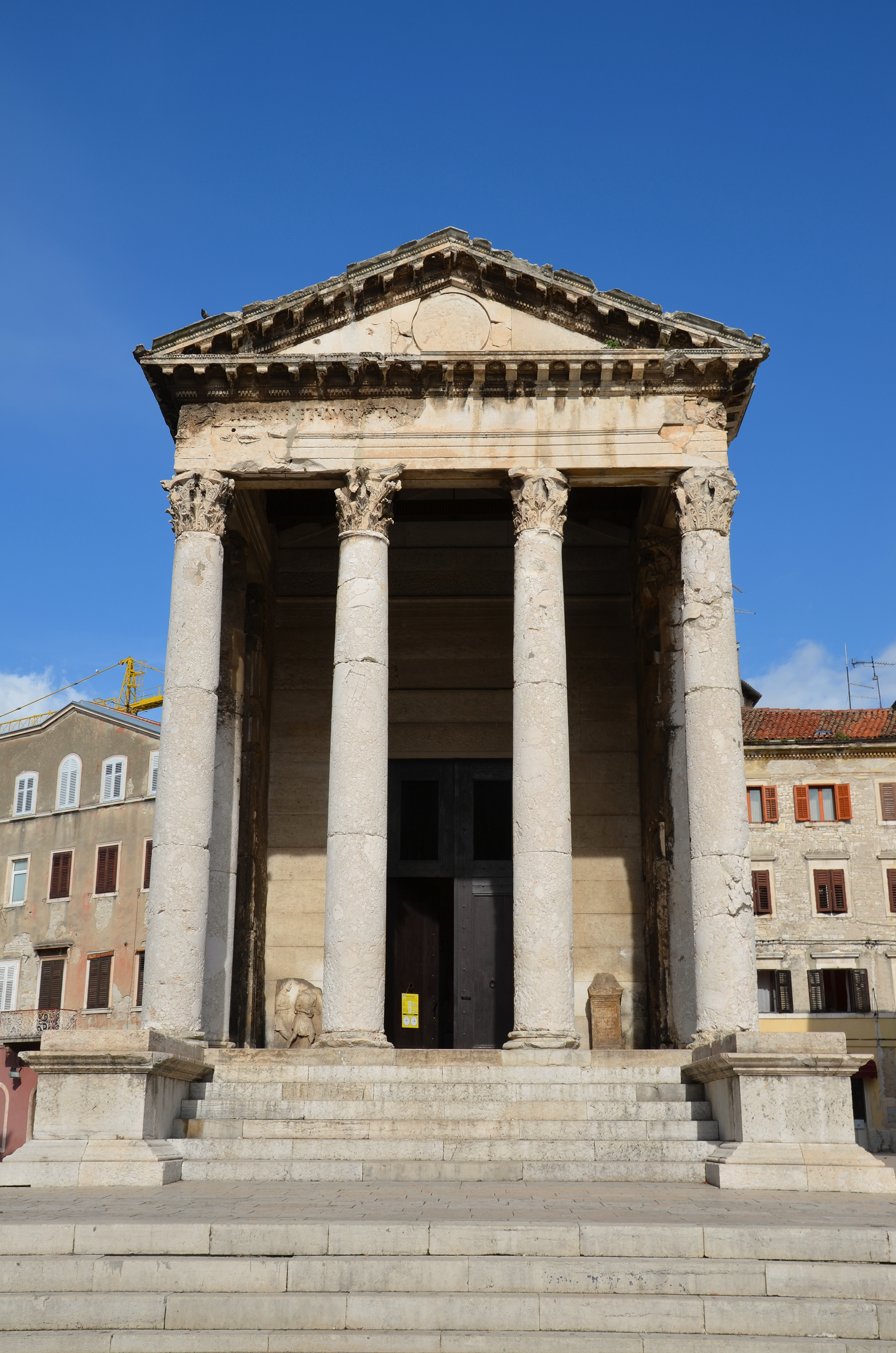

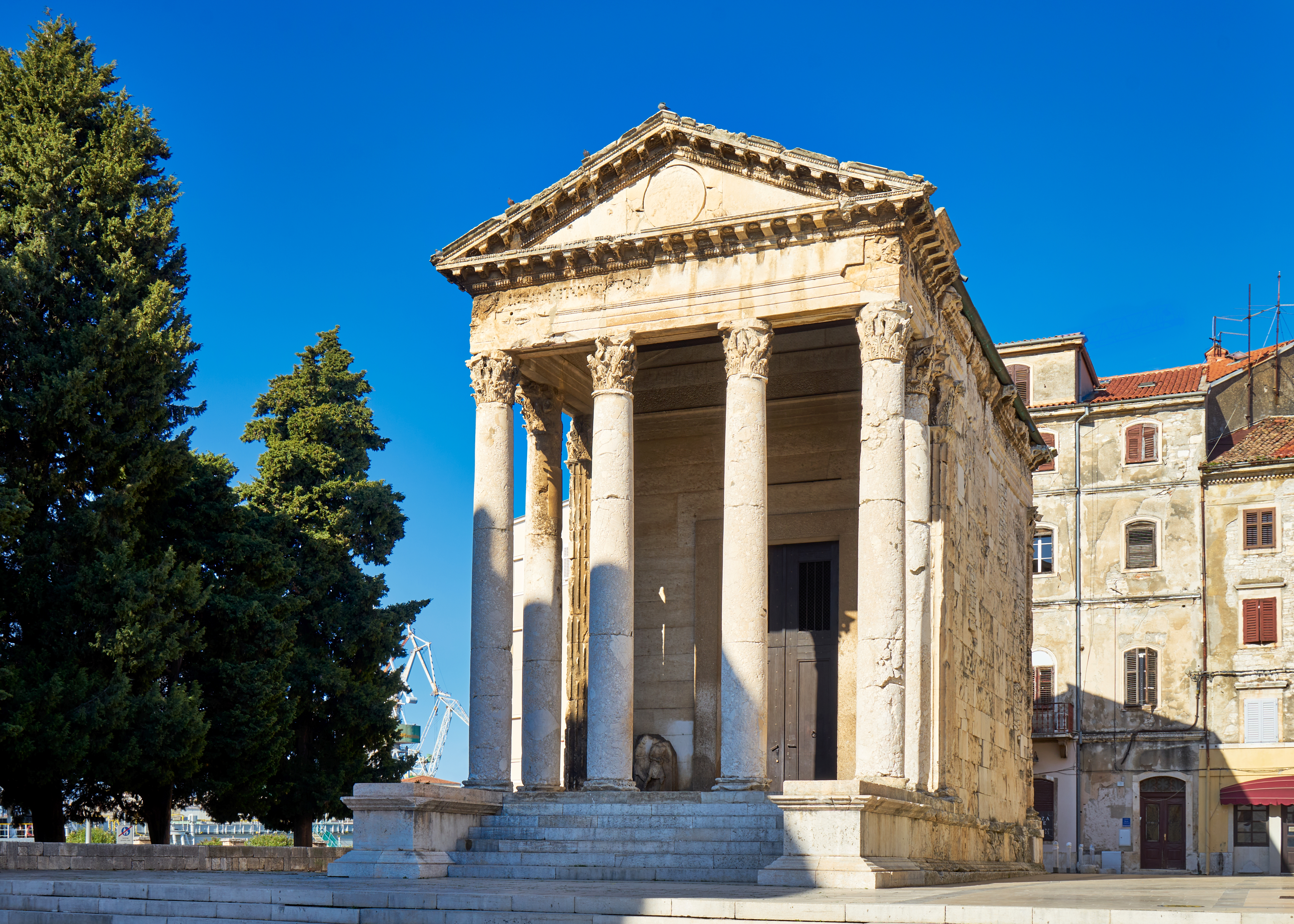
The temple in 2021

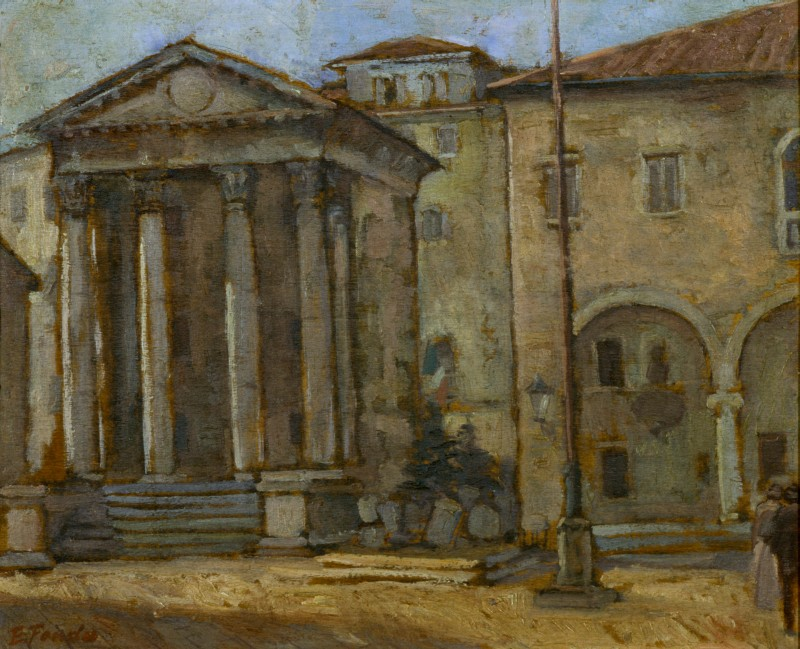
A 1924 painting by Enrico Fonda

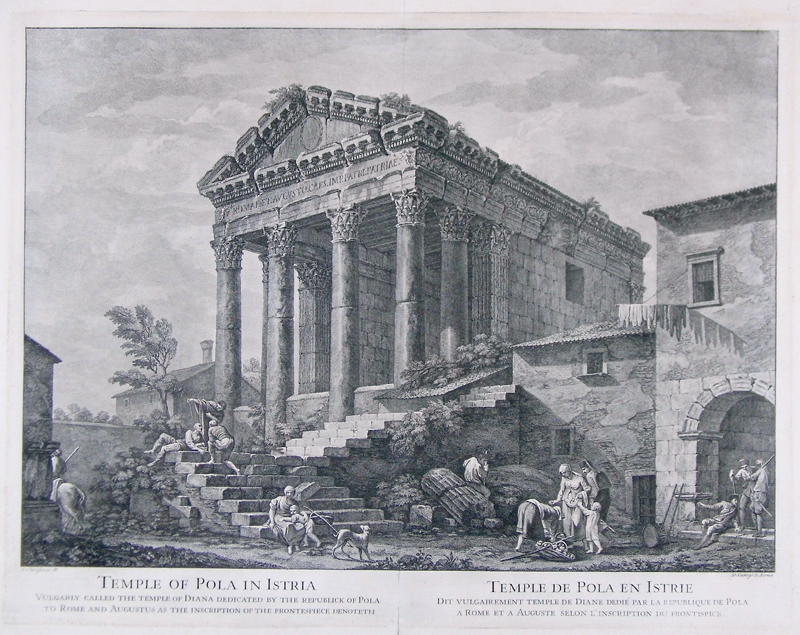
An engraving from the 1760s

== See also ==
- List of Ancient Roman temples
- Pula Arena
- Temple of Augustus in Barcelona
- Monumentum Ancyranum
- Temple of Divus Augustus
- Res gestae divi Augusti

== Bibliography ==
- Džin, Kristina (2012). "Roman Forum Temples in Pula - Religious and Public Use". Hortus Artium Medievalium. 18 (2). Brepols: 389–394. doi:10.1484/J.HAM.1.102823.
- Urošević, Nataša (2012). "Cultural identity and cultural tourism - between the local and the global (a case study of Pula, Croatia)" (PDF). European Journal of Applied Economics. 9 (1). Singidunum University: 67–76. Archived from the original on 2016-07-16.
- Lewis, Bunnell (1892). "The Antiquities of Pola and Aquileia". The Archaeological Journal. 44: 234–396.
