= Toppo (surname) =

Toppo is an Indian surname. Notable people with the surname include:

- Anupam Toppo, Indian cricketer
- Binita Toppo (born 1980), member of the India women's national field hockey team
- Biju Toppo (born 1969), Indian anthropological and documentary filmmaker
- Felix Toppo (born 1947), Indian prelate of the Catholic Church and Archbishop of Ranchi
- Joseph Toppo (1943−2016), Indian politician
- Michael Akasius Toppo (born 1955), bishop of the Roman Catholic Diocese of Tezpur, Assam, India
- Namita Toppo (born 1995), Indian female field hockey player
- Telesphore Toppo (born 1939), Indian cardinal and archbishop of the Roman Catholic Archdiocese
- Walter Toppo (born 1994), Indian cricketer
- Sunelita Toppo (born 2007), Indian field hockey player

== See also ==
- Toppo (disambiguation)
