= Gothic Quarter, Barcelona =

Centre of the old city of Barcelona

Coordinates: 41°22′58″N 2°10′37″E

Barri Gòtic
- Neighborhood of Barcelona
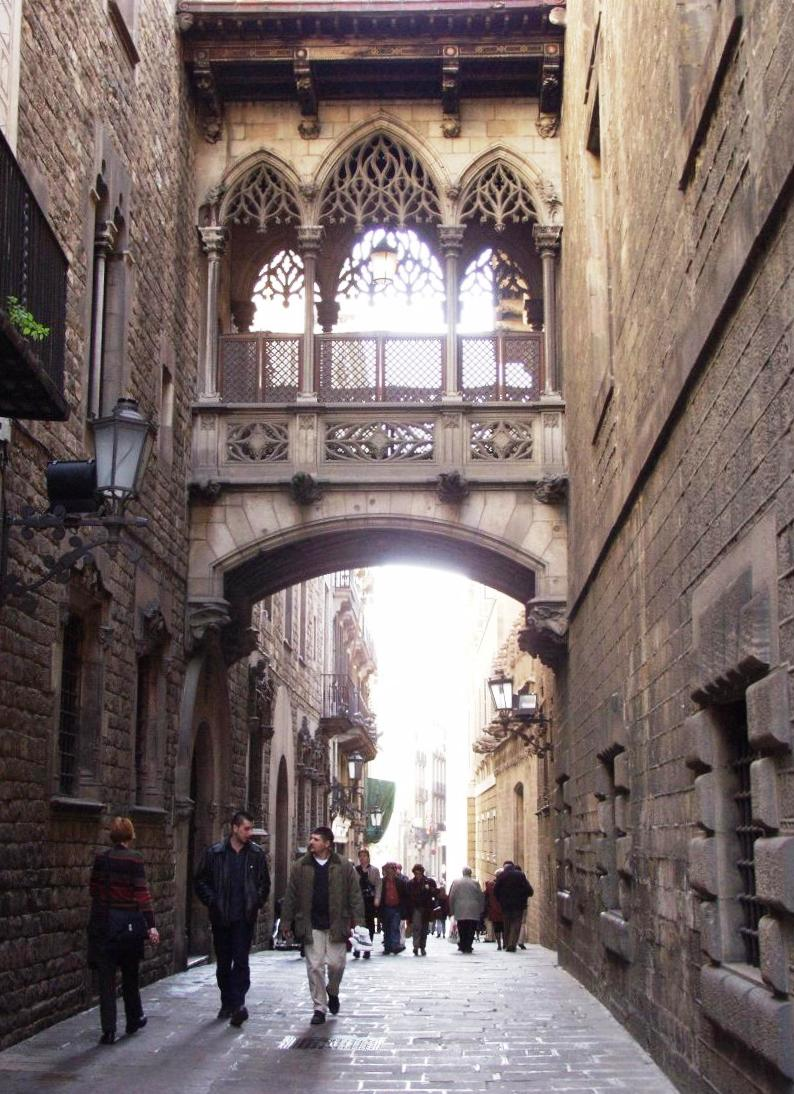
- Pont del Bisbe built in 1928 at Carrer del Bisbe

- Map of the Gothic Quarter within Barcelona
- Country: Spain
- Autonomous Community: Catalonia
- Province: Barcelona
- Comarca: Barcelonès
- Municipality: Barcelona
- District: Ciutat Vella

Population (2023)
  - Total: 24,460
- Postal code: 08002
- Website: ajuntament.barcelona.cat

The Gothic Quarter (Catalan: Barri Gòtic [ˈbari ˈɣɔtik] or El Gòtic; Spanish: Barrio Gótico) is the historic centre of the old city of Barcelona. It stretches from La Rambla to Via Laietana, and from the Mediterranean seafront to the Ronda de Sant Pere. It is a part of Ciutat Vella district.

The quarter encompasses the oldest parts of the city of Barcelona, and includes the remains of the city's Roman wall and several notable medieval landmarks. Much of the present-day fabric of the quarter, however, dates to the 19th and early 20th centuries. El Call, the medieval Jewish quarter, is located within this area, along with the former Sinagoga Major.

The Barri Gòtic retains a labyrinthine street plan, with many small streets opening out into squares. Most of the quarter is closed to regular traffic although open to service vehicles and taxis.

== Authenticity ==
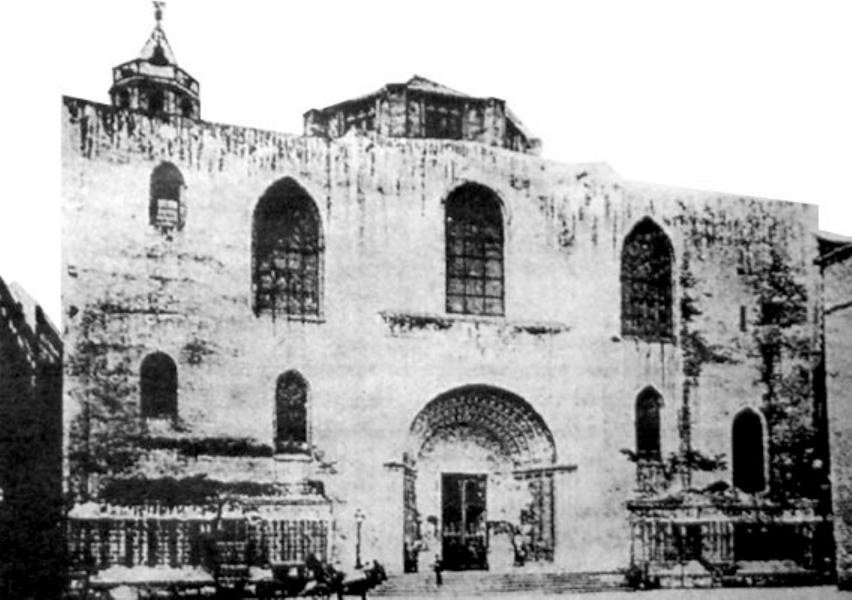
Barcelona Cathedral in the 1880s, before neo-Gothic additions to its façade

Despite its name, a number of landmark Gothic buildings in the neighborhood do not date to the Middle Ages. Rather, in the late 19th and early 20th centuries, the quarter was completely transformed from a sombre neighborhood to a tourist attraction through a massive restoration project, timed to be completed for the 1929 International Exhibition. This allowed the city and the surrounding region of Catalonia to portray itself in a positive light to the world's media. Further restoration of existing buildings and the creation of brand new neo-Gothic structures continued as late as the 1960s.

Among the principal buildings rebuilt or modified with neo-Gothic additions are:

- The façade of the Barcelona Cathedral: constructed between 1882 and 1913 by Josep Oriol Mestres and August Font i Carreras with a profusion of Gothic-style elements.
- Building of the Centre Excursionista de Catalunya (English: Hiking Center of Catalonia) on Carrer Paradís: work by Lluís Domènech i Montaner carried out in 1922 on a building of uncertain origins, to which he added Gothic windows, battlements, and merlons.
- The Flamboyant-style bridge that crosses Carrer Bisbe between the Palau de la Generalitat and the Cases dels Canonges: newly constructed 1928 by Joan Rubió.
- Casa Padellàs: currently the Barcelona City History Museum headquarters, the building was built circa 1500 on Carrer Mercaders, but it was moved to the Plaça del Rei in 1931 with its interior rebuilt.
- Aguilar Palace: present-day Museu Picasso (Carrer Montcada), restored by Adolf Florensa in 1959, who added galleries with arches and Gothic windows.
- Pignatelli Palace: present-day Royal Artistic Circle of Barcelona, restored in 1970 including the addition of various Gothic windows retrieved from municipal warehouses.

== Landmarks ==
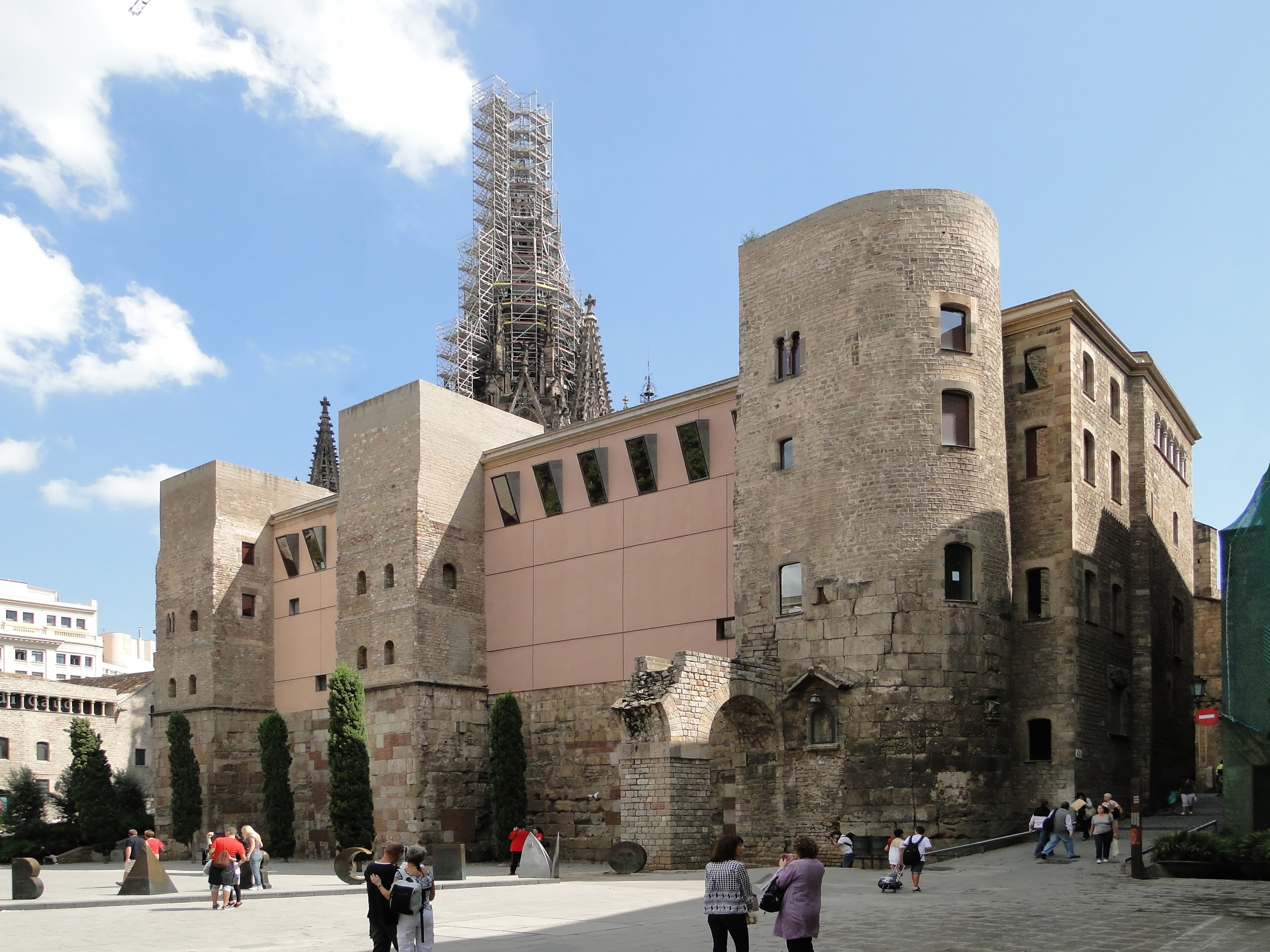
The Roman and Medieval walls

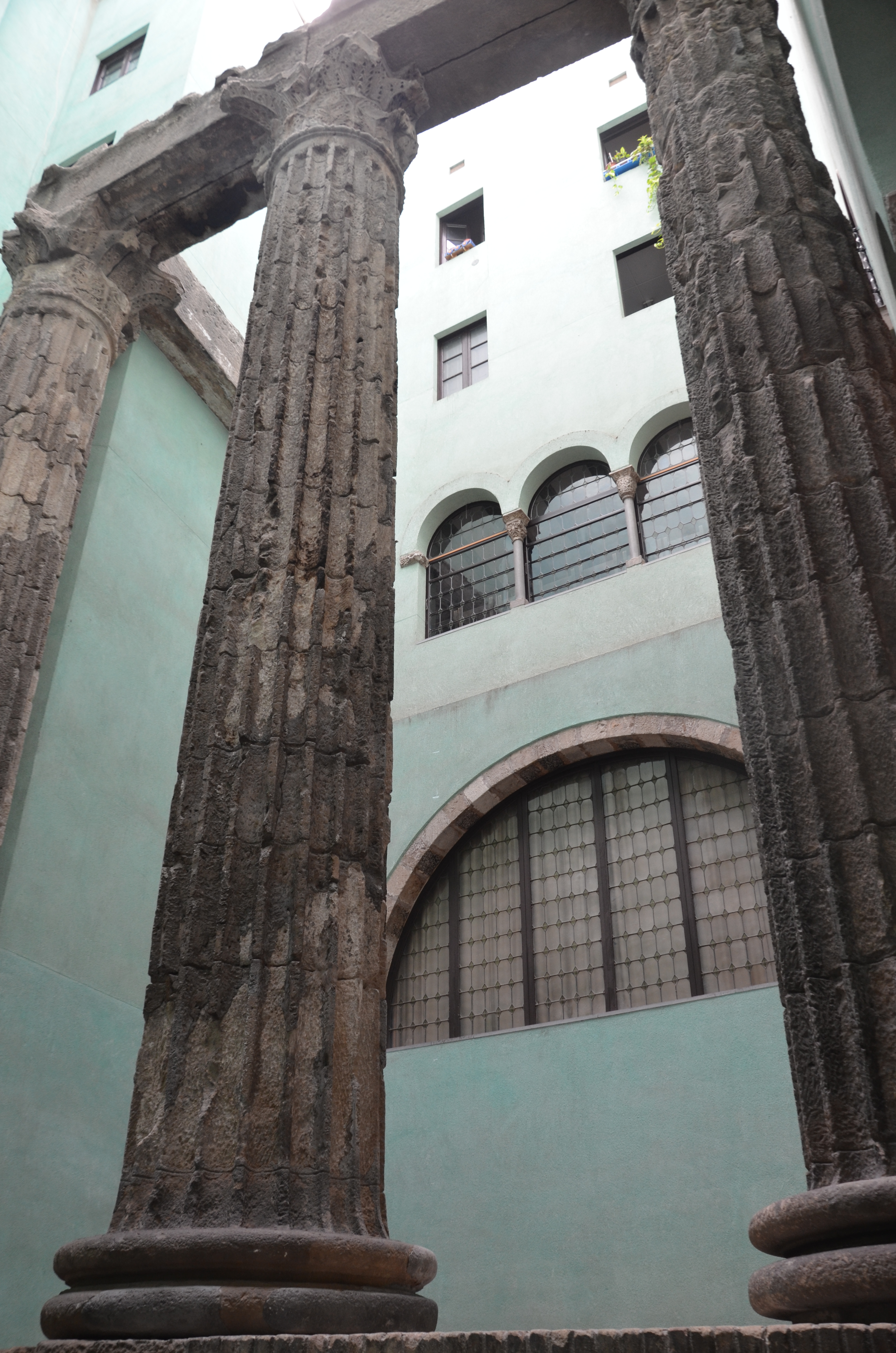
Remains of the Roman Temple

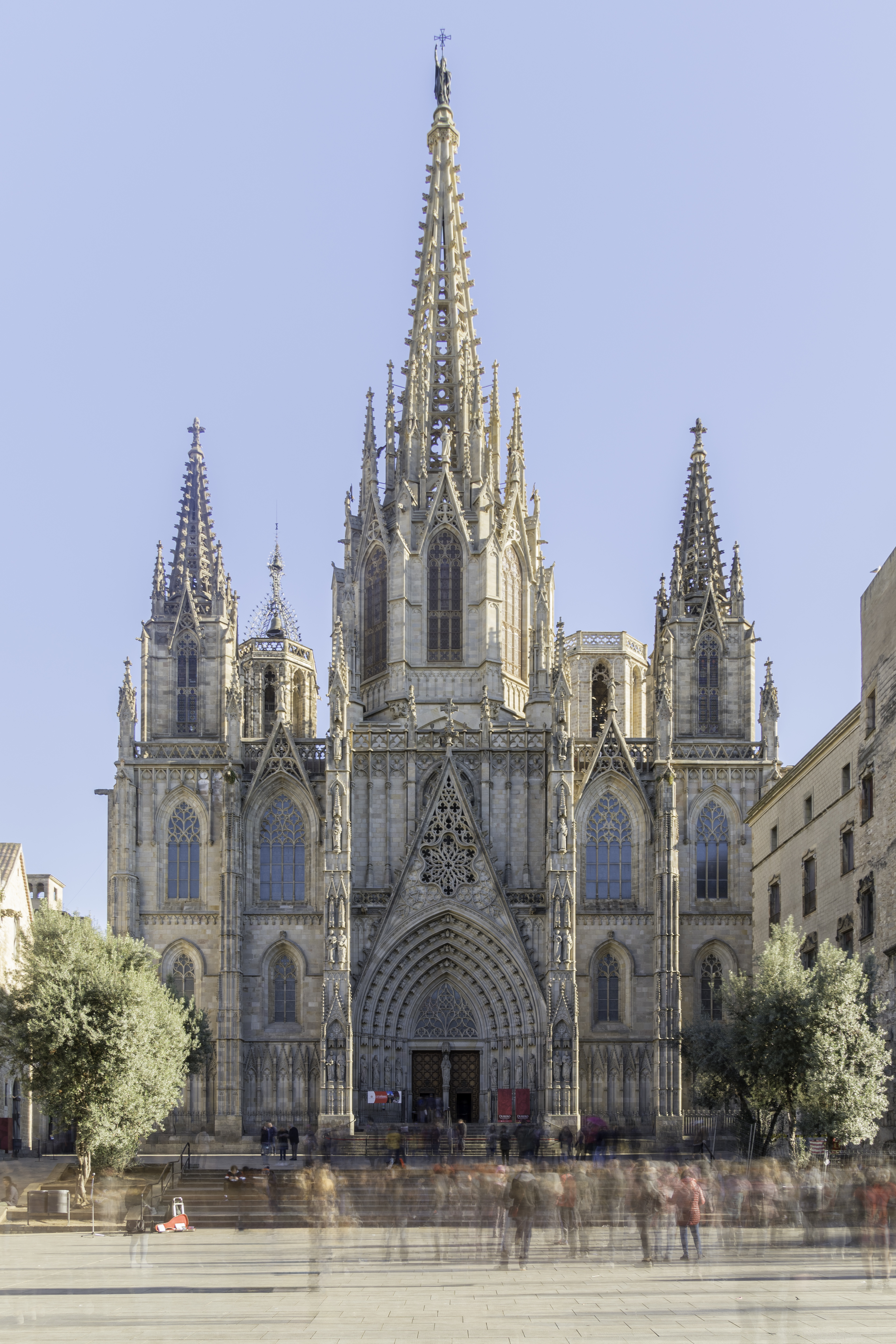
Cathedral of Santa Eulàlia

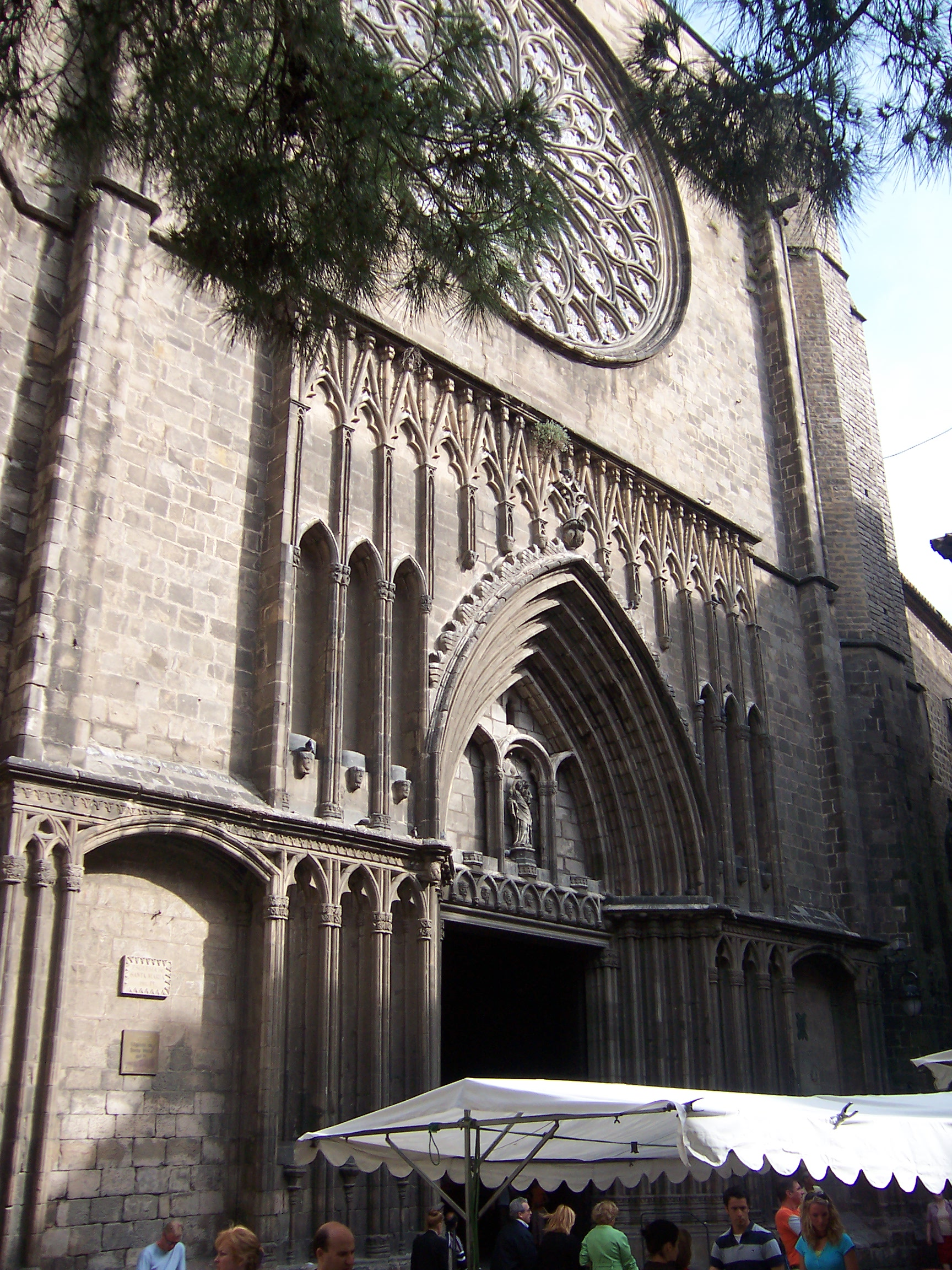
Church of Santa Maria del Pi

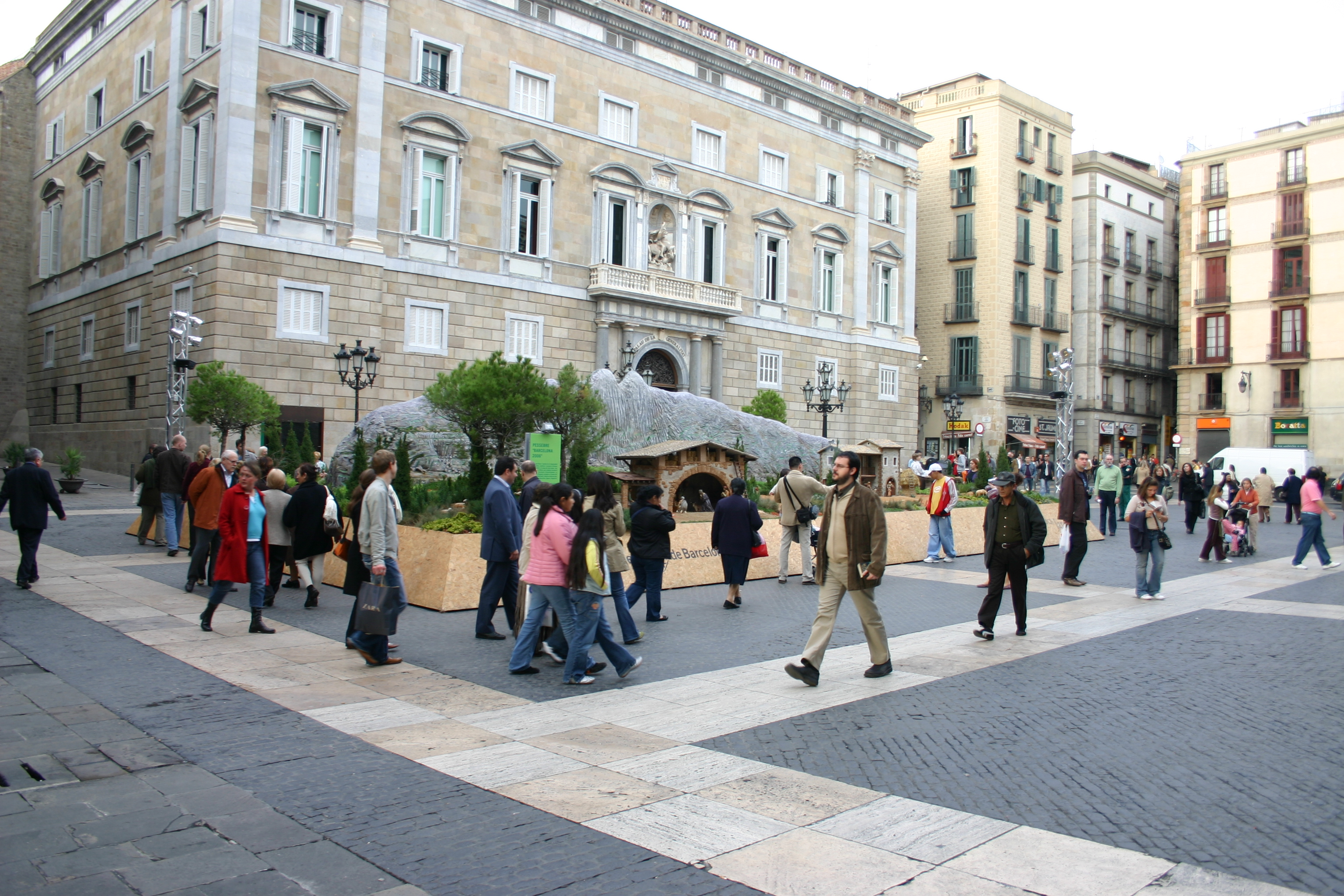
Plaça Sant Jaume and the Palau de la Generalitat de Catalunya

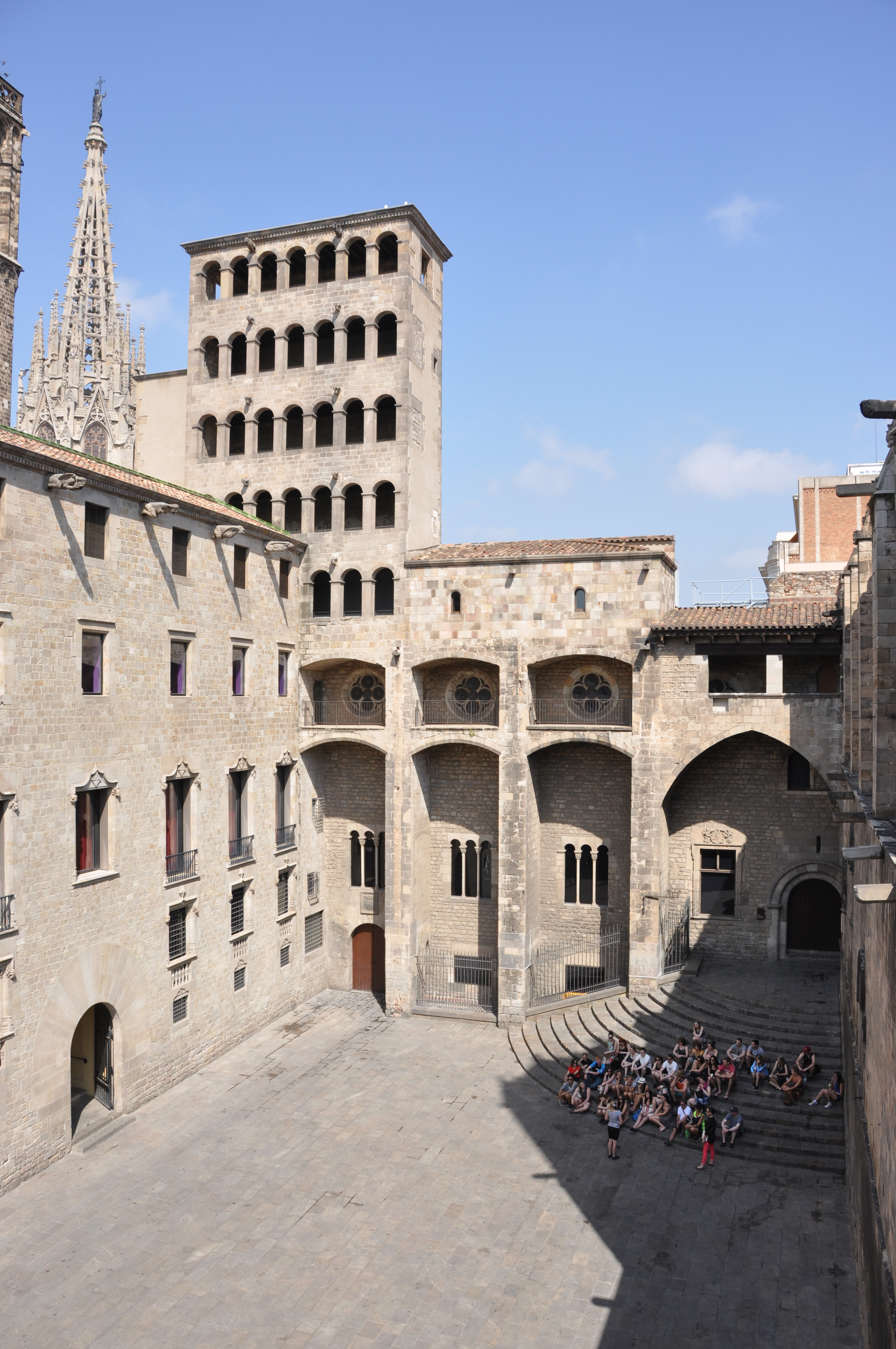
Plaça del Rei

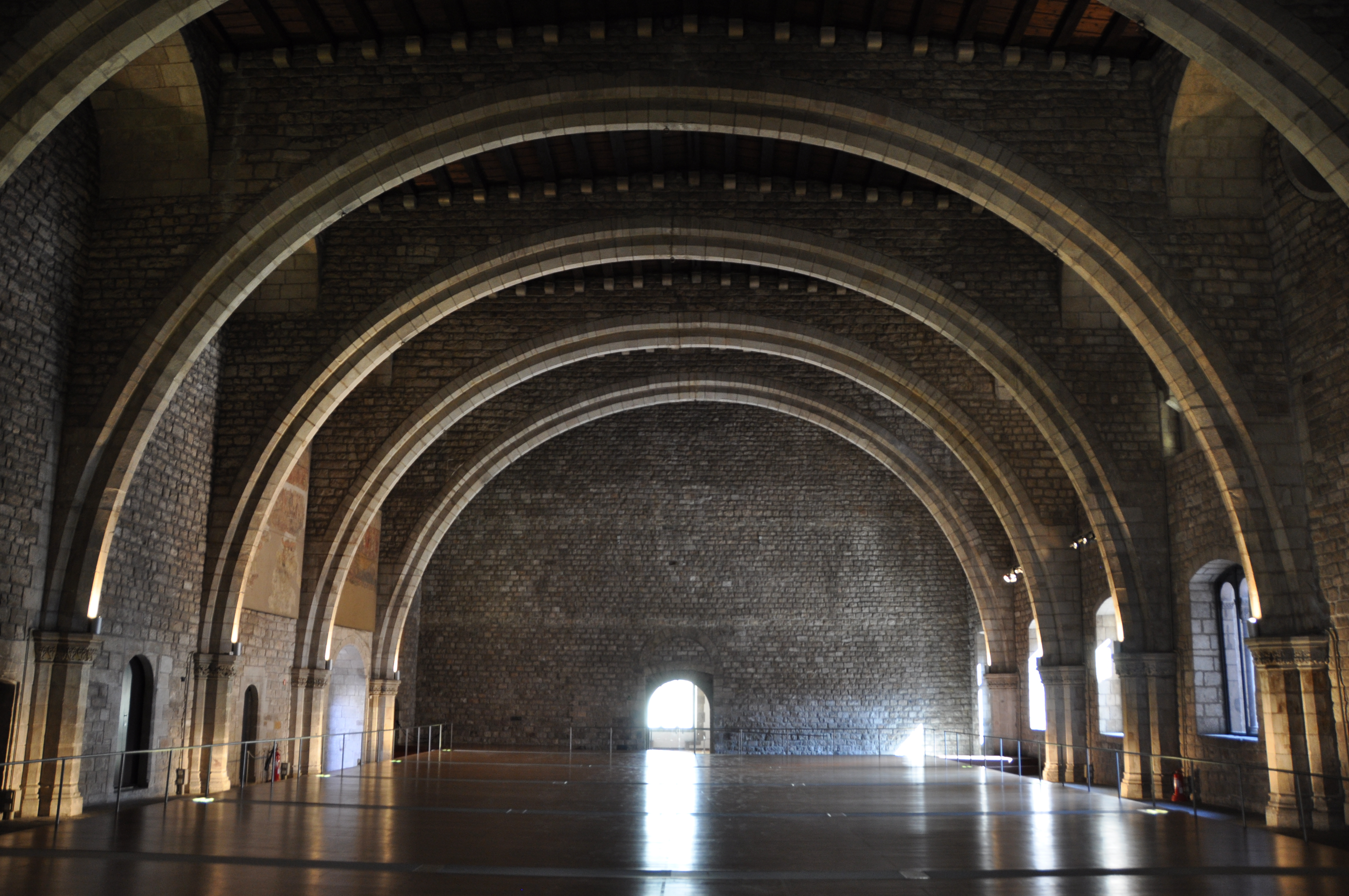
Palau Reial Major

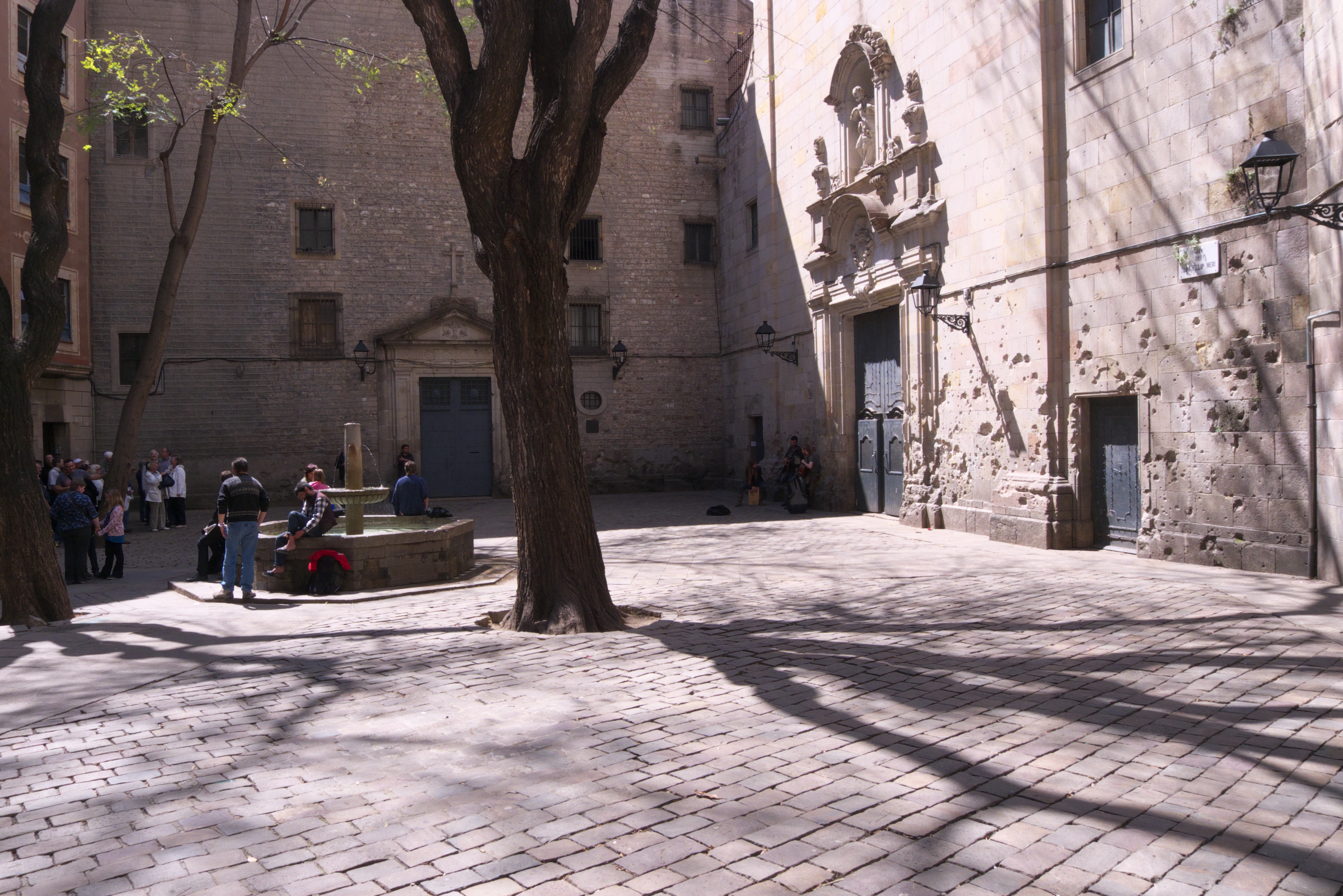
Plaça de Sant Felip Neri

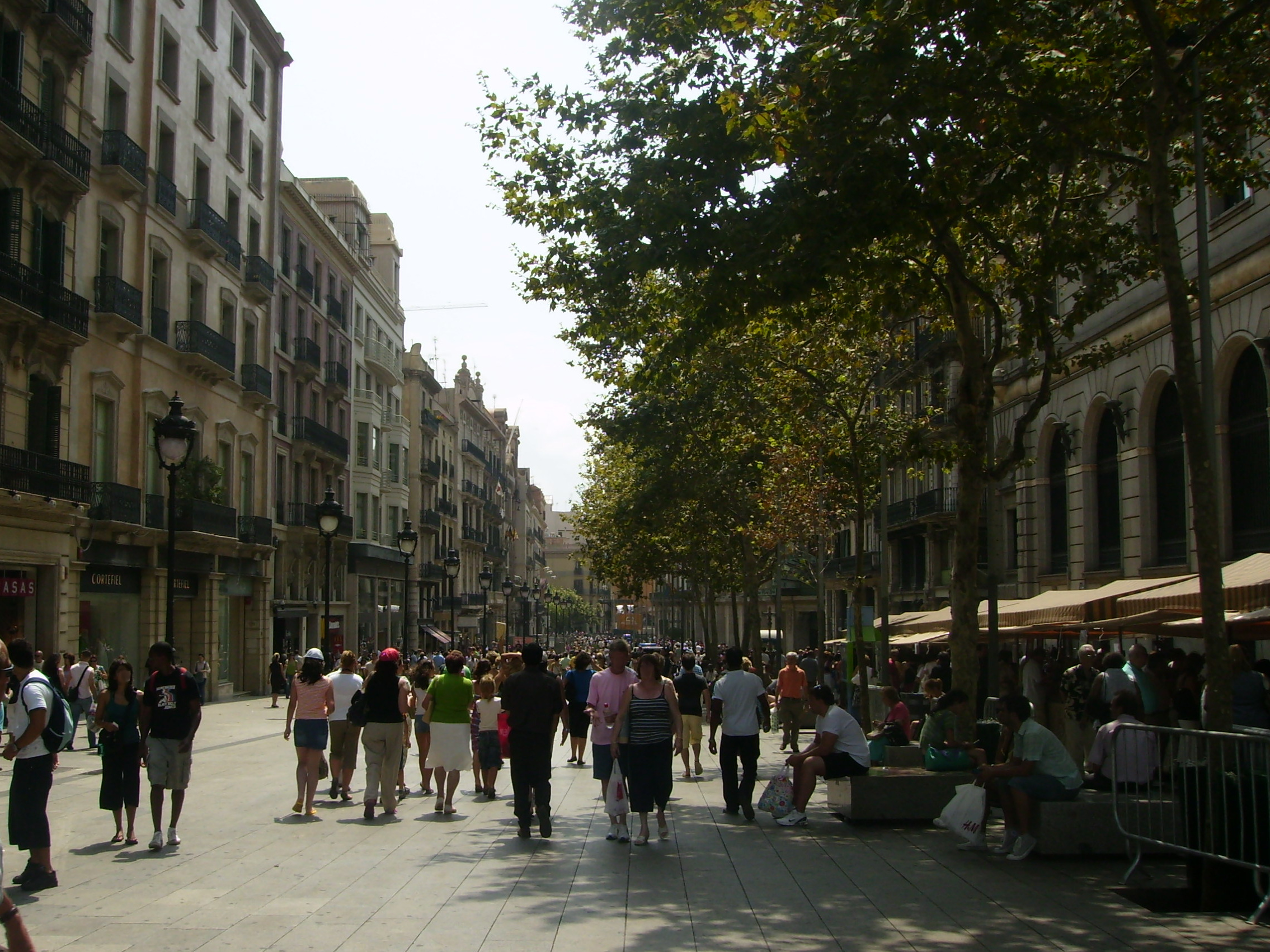
Portal de l'Àngel

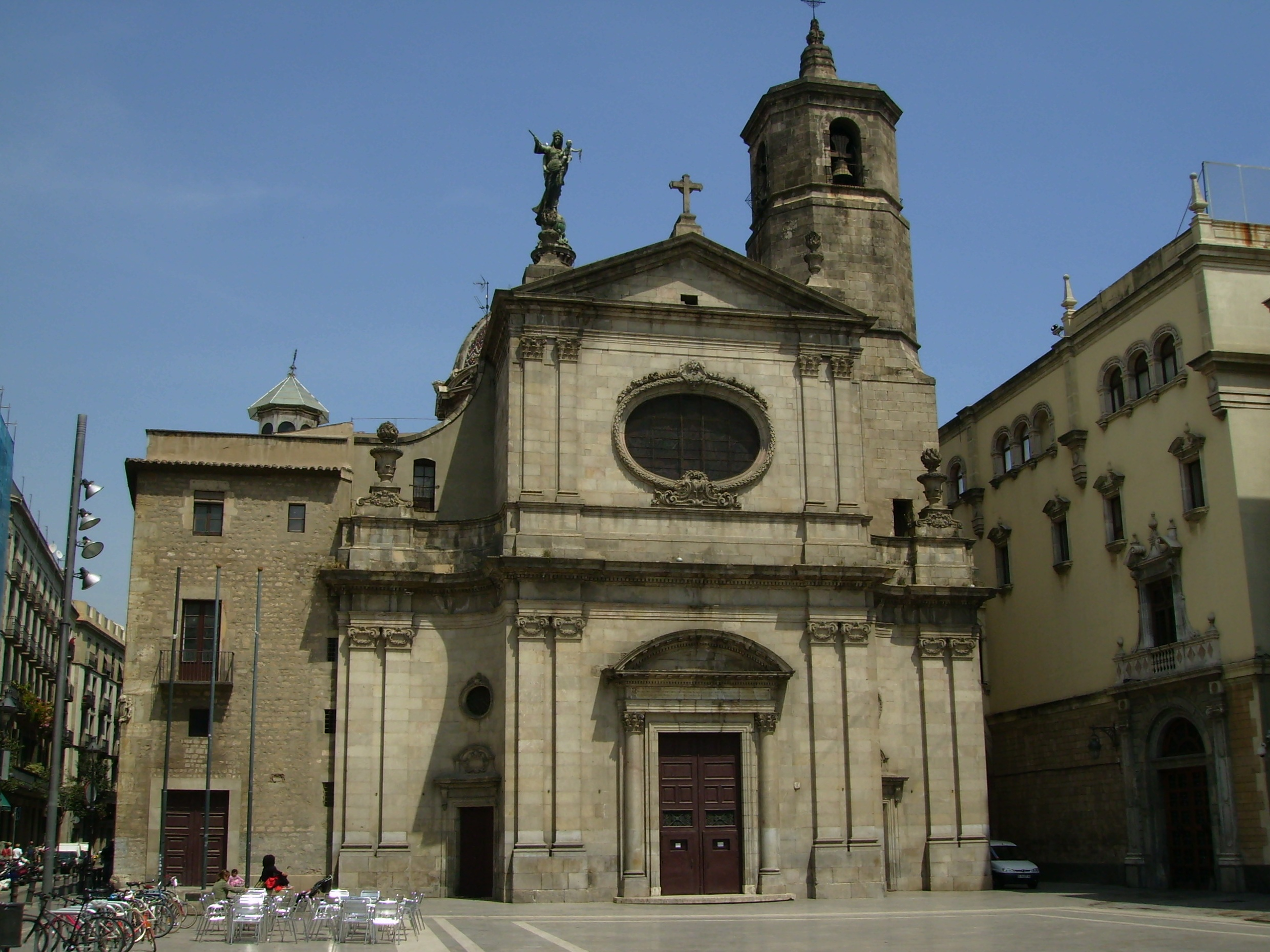
Basilica of La Mercè

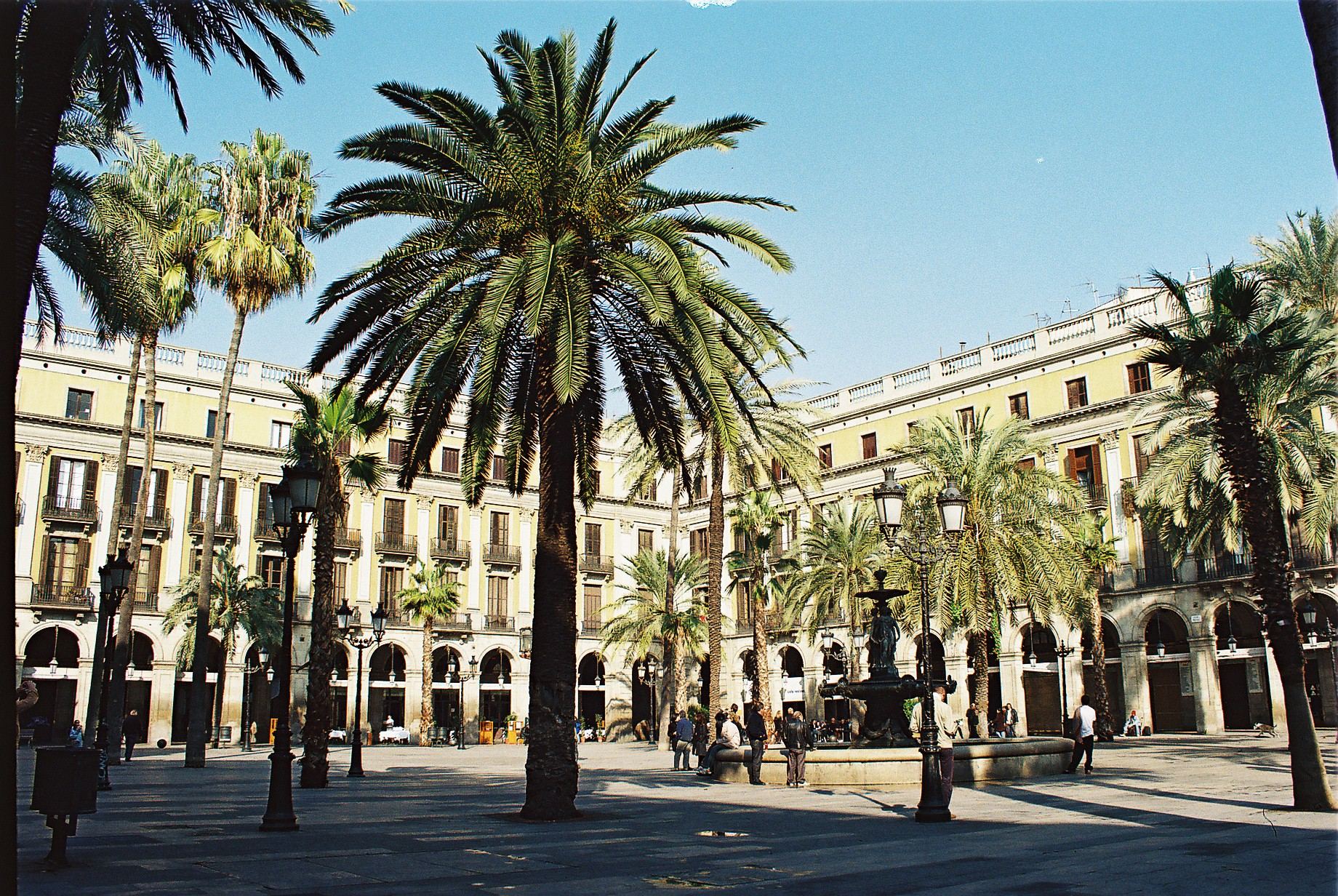
Plaça Reial

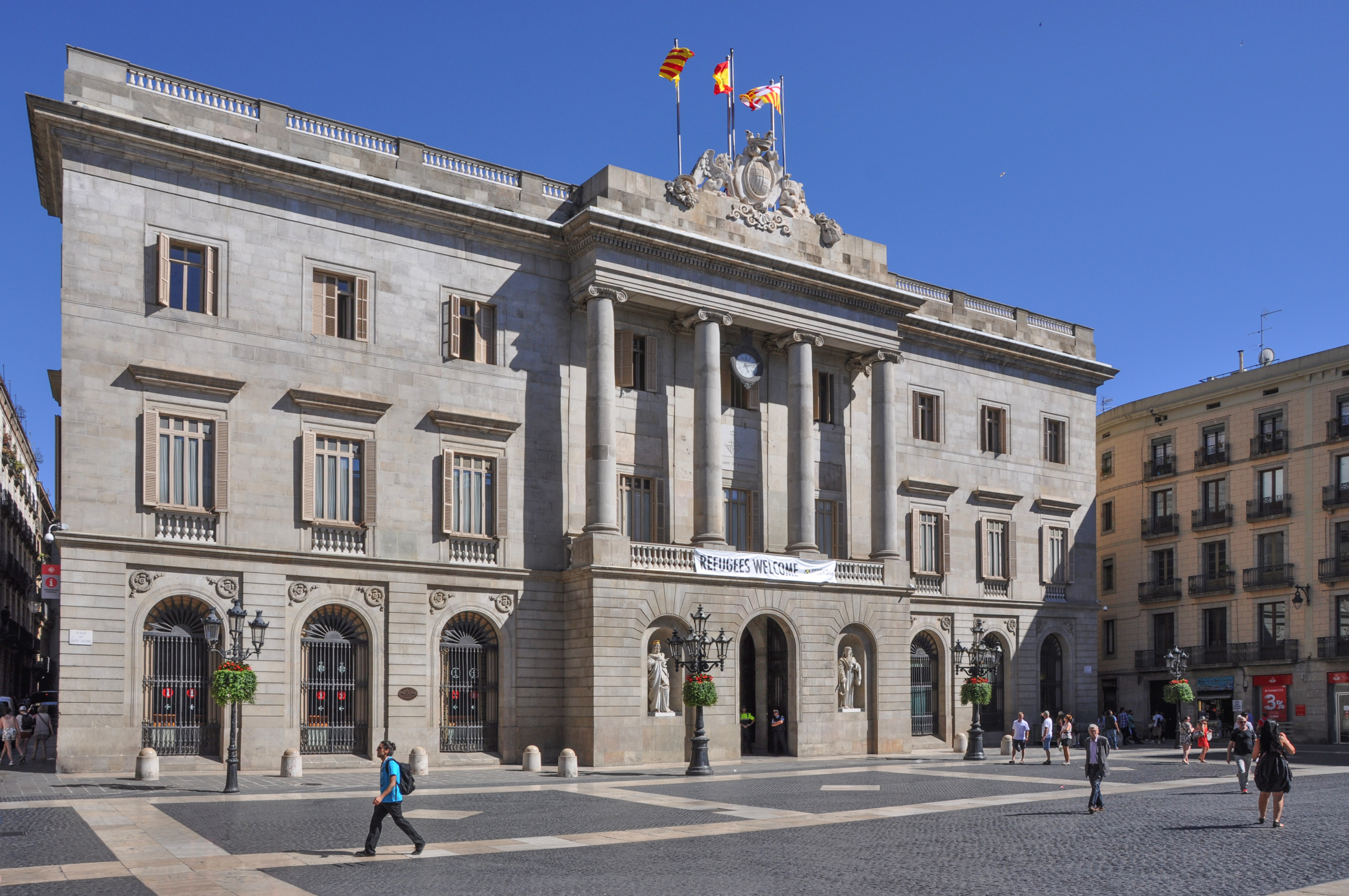
Casa de la Ciutat, City Hall

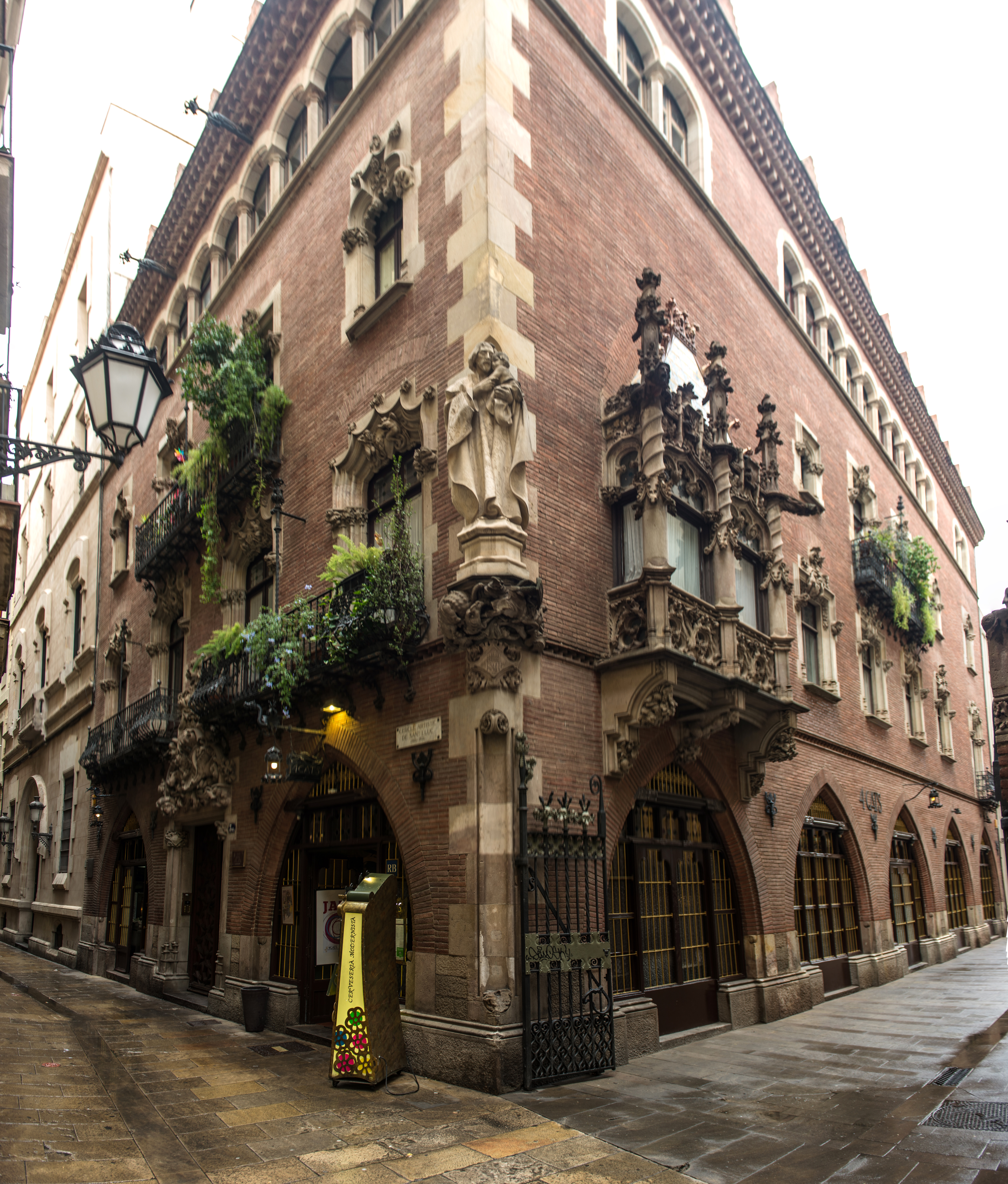
Els Quatre Gats

== Barcelona Metro ==
- L4 station Jaume I
- L3 stations Liceu and Drassanes

== See also ==
- Urban planning of Barcelona
