= Temple of Divus Augustus =

Major temple in Rome built to commemorate Roman emperor, Augustus

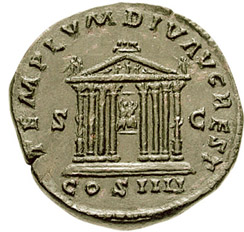
- Temple of Divus Augustus on a coin of Antoninus Pius issued circa AD 158

- Location within Rome
- Interactive map of Temple of Divus Augustus
- 41.891616°N 12.484471°E
- Type: Roman temple
- Location: Regio VIII Forum Romanum

History
- Built: Constructed 37; rebuilt 89/90; restored late 150s
- Built by: Tiberius/?Livia for Augustus

The Temple of Divus Augustus was a major temple originally built to commemorate the deified first Roman emperor, Augustus. It was built between the Palatine and Capitoline Hills, behind the Basilica Julia, on the site of the house that Augustus had inhabited before he entered public life in the mid-1st century BC. It is known from Roman coinage that the temple was originally built to an Ionic hexastyle design. However, its size, physical proportions and exact site are unknown. Provincial temples of Augustus, such as the much smaller Temple of Augustus in Pula, now in Croatia, had already been constructed during his lifetime. Probably because of popular resistance to the notion, he was not officially deified in Rome until after his death, when a temple at Nola in Campania, where he died, seems to have been begun. Subsequently, temples were dedicated to him all over the Roman Empire.

== History ==
The temple's construction took place during the 1st century AD, having been vowed by the Roman Senate shortly after the death of the emperor in AD 14. Ancient sources disagree on whether it was constructed by Augustus' successor Tiberius and Augustus' widow Livia or by Tiberius alone. It was not until after the death of Tiberius in 37 that the temple was finally completed and dedicated by his successor Caligula. Some scholars have suggested that the delays in completing the temple indicated that Tiberius had little regard for the honours of his predecessor. Others have argued the opposite case, pointing to evidence that Tiberius made his last journey from his villa on Capri with the intention of entering Rome and dedicating the temple. However, the emperor died at Misenum on the Bay of Naples before he could set off for the capital. Ittai Gradel suggests that the long building phase of the temple was a sign of the painstaking effort that went into its construction.

The long-awaited dedication took place in the last two days of August 37. According to the historian Cassius Dio, the commemorative events ordered by Caligula were exceptionally extravagant. A two-day horse race took place along with the slaughter of 400 bears and "an equal number of wild beasts from Libya", and Caligula postponed all lawsuits and suspended all mourning "in order that no one should have an excuse for failing to attend". The splendour and timing of the commemorations was a carefully calculated political act; not only was August the month in which the late emperor had died (and which was named after him), but the climax of the celebrations occurred on Caligula's birthday and the last day of his consulship. The combination of these events would have served to emphasise that Caligula was Augustus' direct descendant. Claudius later ordered that a statue of Augustus' wife Livia be raised in the temple and that sacrifices in her honour were to be made by the Vestal Virgins.

During the reign of Domitian the Temple of Divus Augustus was destroyed by fire but was rebuilt and rededicated in 89/90 with a shrine to his favourite deity, Minerva. The temple was redesigned as a memorial to four deified emperors, including Vespasian and Titus. It was restored again in the late 150s by Antoninus Pius, who was perhaps motivated by a desire to be publicly associated with the first emperor. The exact date of the restoration is not known, but the restored temple is shown on coins of 158 onwards, which depict it with an octastyle design with Corinthian capitals and two statues – presumably of Augustus and Livia – in the cella. The pediment displayed a relief featuring Augustus and was topped by a quadriga. Two figures stood on the eaves of the roof, that on the left representing Romulus and the one on the right depicting Aeneas leading his family out of Troy, alluding to Rome's origin-myth. The steps of the temple were flanked by two statues of Victory.

The Temple of Divus Augustus was described in Latin literature as templum Augusti or divi Augusti, though Martial and Suetonius call it templum novum ("the new temple"), a name attested in the Acta Arvalia from AD 36. There are references to a library erected by Tiberius in the vicinity of the temple, called the bibliotecha templi novi or templi Augusti. Caligula was said to have later built a bridge connecting the Palatine and Capitoline hills, passing over the temple. Other than the well-attested cult statues of Augustus and Livia, little is known about the temple's decoration other than a reference by Pliny to a painting of Hyacinthus by Nicias of Athens, which was given to the temple by Tiberius.

The last known reference to the temple was on 27 May 218; at some point thereafter it was completely destroyed and its stones were presumably quarried for later buildings. Its remains are not visible and the area in which it lay has never been excavated.

== See also ==
- List of Ancient Roman temples
- Monumentum Ancyranum
- Temple of Augustus, Pula
- Temple of Augustus, Barcelona
