= Toppo =

Toppo may refer to:

- Toppo (food), chocolate and bread-based snack
- Toppo (surname), surname
- Mitsubishi Toppo, light recreational vehicle

== See also ==
- Topo (disambiguation)
