= Plaça del Rei =

Square in Barcelona, Spain

Coordinates: 41.38409°N 2.17747°E

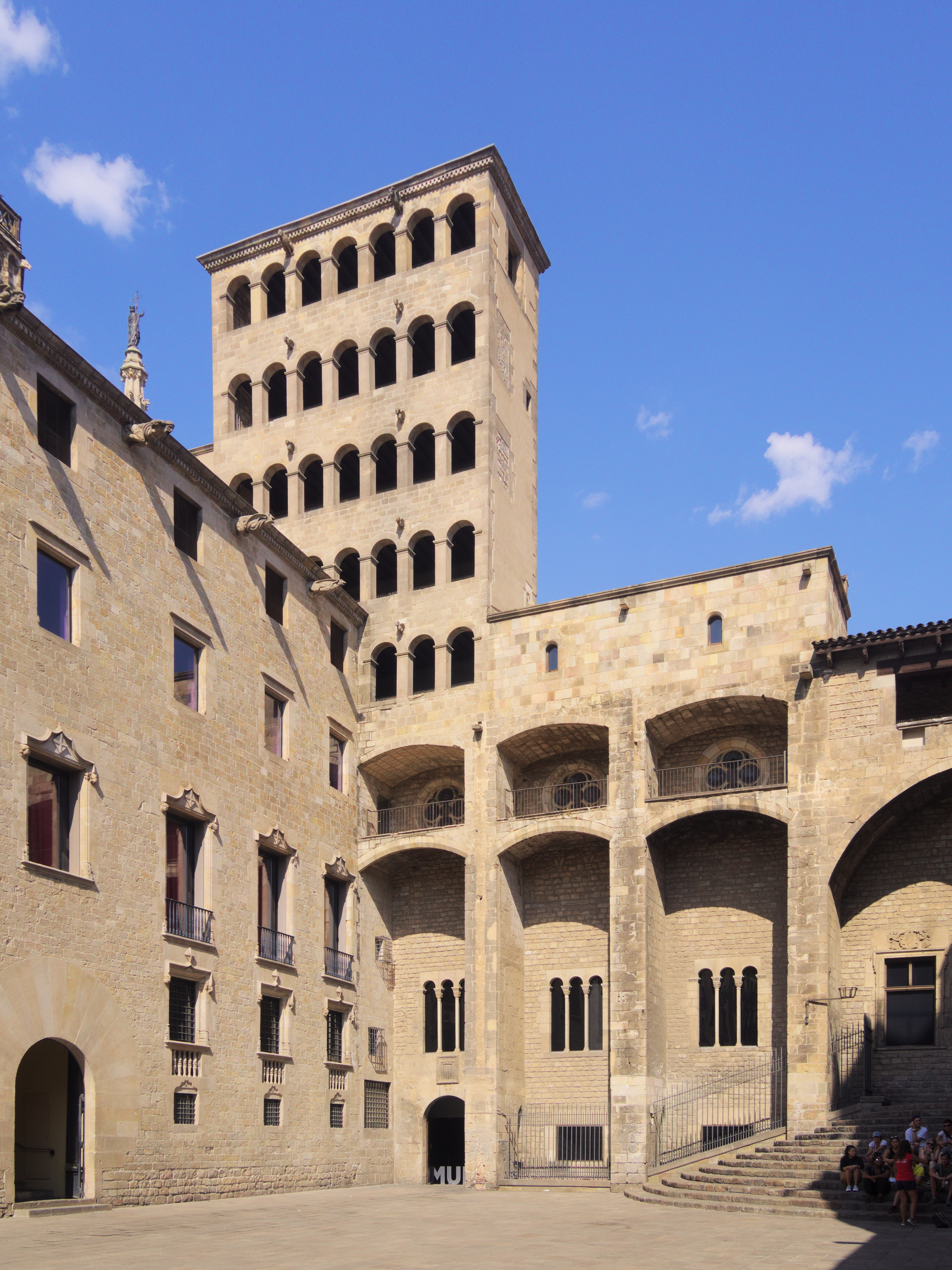
Mirador del Rei Martí

Plaça del Rei (meaning "King's Square" in Catalan, in Spanish: Plaza del Rey) is a 14th-century medieval public square in the Barri Gòtic of Barcelona, Catalonia, Spain.

The square is surrounded by the Palau Reial Major including the Saló del Tinell, the Palau del Lloctinent ("Lieutenant's Palace"), the 15th-century tower Mirador del Rei Martí ("King Martin's Watchtower"), and the Capella Reial de Santa Àgata ("Royal Chapel of St Agatha"). On its southern side stands Casa Padellàs (Padellàs's House) a 15th–16th century palazzo moved here stone by stone from Mercaders Street in 1931 and since 1943, has housed the Barcelona City History Museum (MUHBA).

Topos V, a work by Eduardo Chillida, underlines one of the corners of the square.
