= Topos Bookstore Cafe =

Bookstore and cafe in Ridgewood, Queens

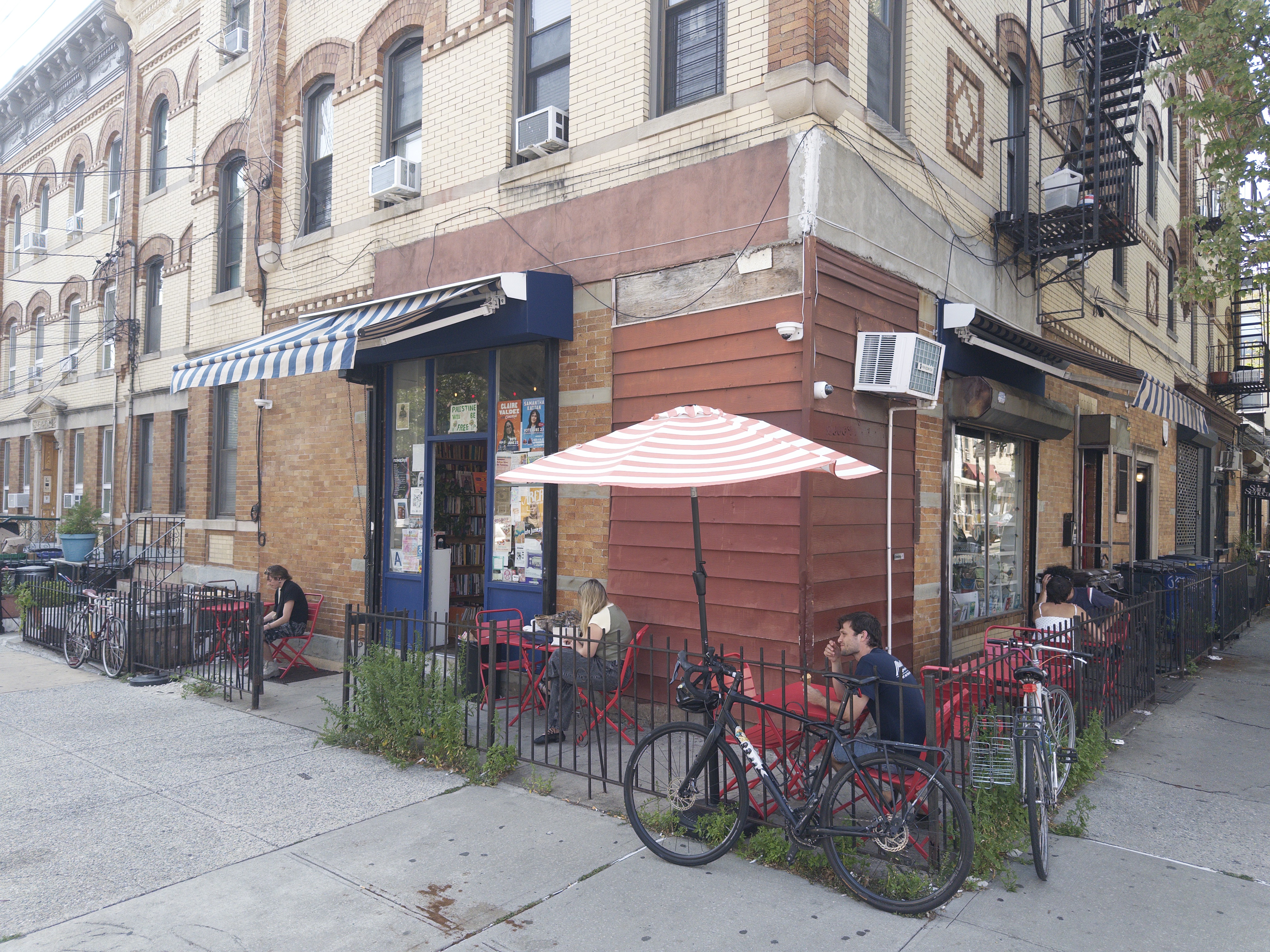
- Interactive map of Topos Bookstore Cafe

Restaurant information
- Established: 2014
- Owners: Benjamin Friedman; Cosmo Bjorkenheim.; Anny Oberlink
- Location: 788 Woodward Avenue, Ridgewood, Queens, New York
- Coordinates: 40°42′13″N 73°54′13″W
- Website: www.toposbookstore.com

Topos Bookstore Cafe (also known as Topos Bookstore and informally as Topos Coffee) is a used bookstore and café in Ridgewood, Queens, New York City. In 2024, Time Out New York included the shop in a list of the city's best bookstore cafés.

== History ==
Topos began on the corner of Woodward Avenue and Putnam Avenue in Ridgewood. The bookstore opened in December 2014, with the café slated to follow in January 2015.

By July 2015, the co-owner/managers were Benjamin Friedman, Cosmo Bjorkenheim, and Anny Oberlink, and the shop combined used-book retail with a café. A 2016 feature on used bookstores also discussed Topos's early programming and community use of the space.

In 2023, the owners expanded with a second location, Topos Too, a bookstore-café with beer and wine on Myrtle Avenue in Ridgewood.

== Operations ==
The original store operates as a used-book bookstore and café, buying and selling used books and serving coffee (including beans from Variety Coffee), with seating inside and on the sidewalk. The shops regularly host book launches, poetry readings, and small-press events.

== Reception ==
Time Out New York included Topos Bookstore Cafe in its 2024 list of the best bookstore cafés in New York City, calling it a Ridgewood staple since 2014. In a 2021 neighborhood guide, Condé Nast Traveler recommended Topos for coffee and browsing used and new titles. Earlier local coverage profiled the shop shortly after opening, highlighting its co-owners and community focus. A 2015 QNS article also described the store's role in the borough's literary life.

== See also ==
- Coffeehouse
- Independent bookstore
- Ridgewood, Queens
