= Los Topos =

American community theatre group

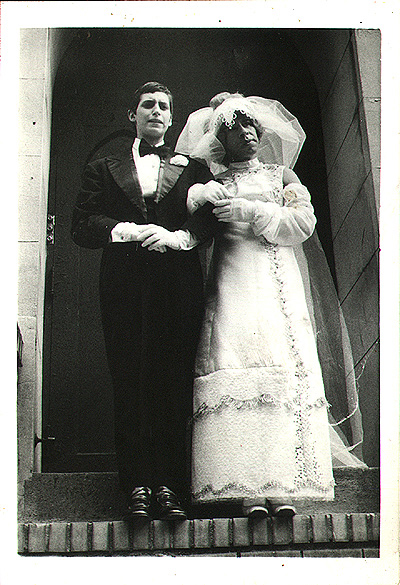
The Royal Drag -Topo and Jimini are married in drag on the same day as Prince Charles and Lady Di

Los Topos was a subversive, community theatre group in California during the 1970s. They named themselves after the Spanish word for "mole" (topo), referring to their undergroup activities.

== History ==
One member of this group even adopted Topo as his stage name. He later specialised in 'robotics' miming mechanical robots. Together with Jimini Hignett he formed his own fringe company 'Christians from Outer Space' performing satirical theatre together, and on July 29, 1981 (the same day as Prince Charles and Lady Diana) they were married - he dressed as Diana, Jimini as Charles. At the wedding - dubbed ‘The Royal Drag’ by the Soho News - all guests are also cross-dressed (the Queen Mum sporting an enormous hairy back and a hat made from pizza boxes). The preacher at first refuses to conduct the ceremony, thinking they were both men. The event is shown on the Channel 7 TV-news.
