= Topos de Tlatelolco =

Mexican rescue team

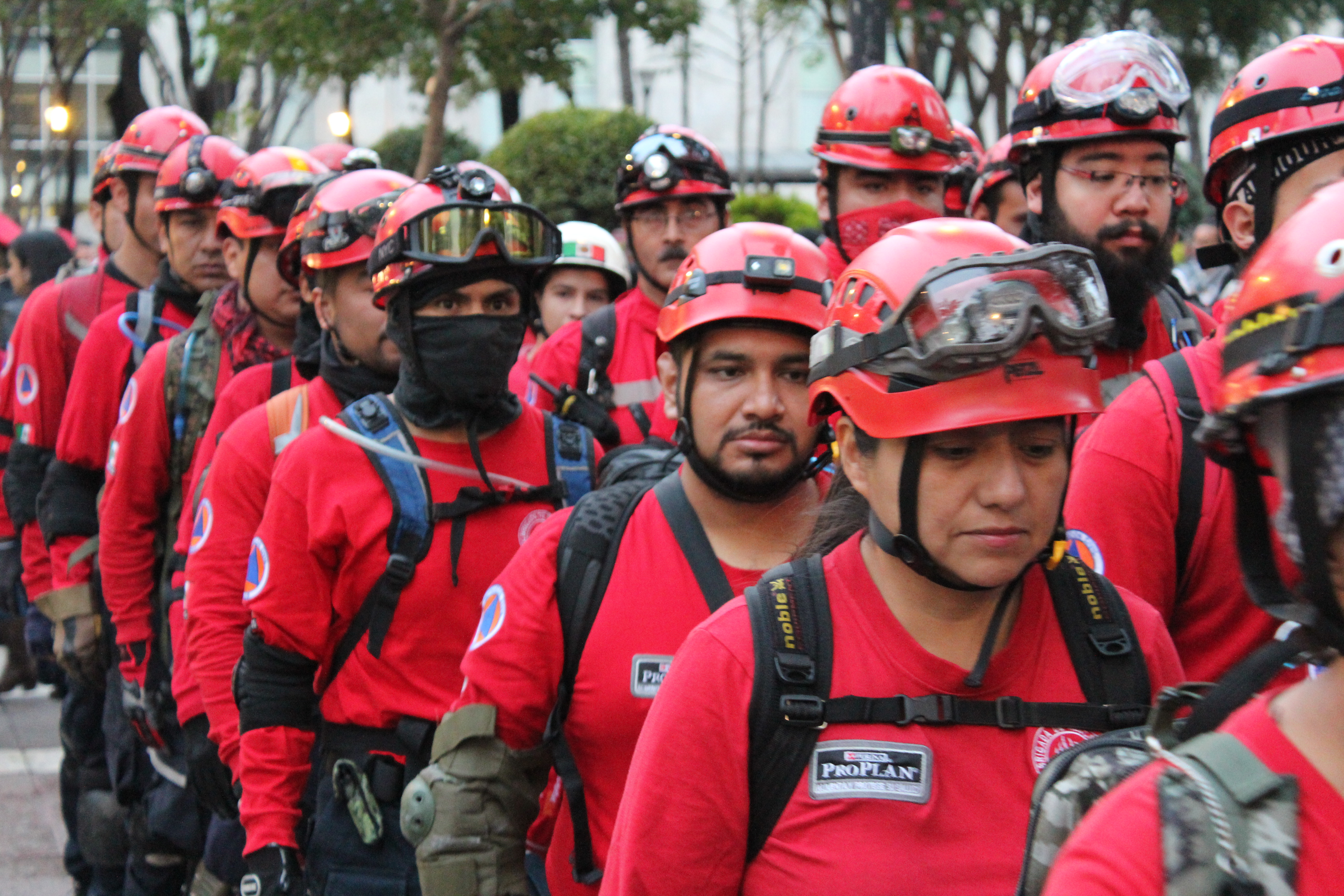
Brigada Topos Tlatelolco at the 30 year commemoration of the 1985 Mexico City earthquake

The Brigada Internacional de Rescate Tlatelolco A.C, commonly known as the Topos de Tlatelolco or Los Topos, is a professional non-profit Mexican rescue team.

== Composition ==
Their specialty is searching for victims under the debris of collapsed buildings and giving first aid. One of the group's original founders, Hector "El Chino" Méndez, states that one of the things that distinguish his group from others is that they have the "balls to go in where no one else will" (huevos de entrar adonde los demás no quieren).

As of 2005, the organization had an average of about forty members plus search and rescue dogs which they train themselves. The group, along with the Civil Protection Agency of Mexico, issues certificates and sponsors technical degrees in areas related to the field. An enlisted volunteer is trained in areas such as rescue strategies, managing collapsed structures and risk management. The main group is in Mexico City but there are branches in other parts of the country such as Poza Rica, Veracruz, Cancún and Chihuahua.

The group maintains ties with the International Rescue and Assistance League in France and the United Firemen without Frontiers in Spain. It also has associates in the United States, El Salvador, Bolivia, Peru, Germany and Indonesia. Within Mexico, the group coordinates with social organizations and government agencies such as the Secretary of the Navy, the Secretary of Defense and the Secretary of the Interior. However, their longest association is with the government of Mexico City, whose professional ambulance corps along with the Mexican Red Cross assisted with the initial training of rescue dogs.

== History ==
The organization began when a group of youths decided to help with rescue efforts in the aftermath of the 1985 Mexico City earthquake They mostly assisted by searching collapsed buildings for victims, risking their own lives in the process. None of the initial volunteers had any training, experience or equipment, but now the Topos are a professional team which have aided in rescue efforts in Mexico and various countries.

The group was formally organized in February 1986, five months after the earthquake, in part because Mexico did not have any formal search and rescue training or services.

Since 1985, the Topos have assisted rescue and recovery efforts in over twenty-two countries. On volunteers' uniforms one can see written where they have been to help. One of the first was the 1986 San Salvador earthquake, only one year after the earthquake that was the impetus for the group's founding. Within Mexico, they have assisted after disasters in Manzanillo, Puebla and Oaxaca. They usually travel by commercial airliner, which limits equipment to thirty kilograms per person. Most of this equipment is simple, such as picks, drills and eyebolts.

Outside of Mexico, they have been to Taiwan, New York City, Iran, Venezuela, and Colombia.

However, they state that the most difficult work they have done so far was in Indonesia, after the 2004 tsunami. The brigade pays for most of its own expenses, which often has them arriving by whatever means is available. When they went to Indonesia, the heavily discounted plane tickets from Japan Airlines only took them as far as Singapore. Once there, the group did not have money for the ferry to Indonesia and had to leave much of its equipment behind. The workers themselves made it to Banda Aceh only because a Baptist minister overheard the group arguing over money and gave them the US$400 they needed to cross. They ate whatever they could, slept in tents distributed by the Chinese government and hitched rides to disaster sites on Indonesian police trucks. Most of the work done was to remove bodies from the mud and debris left behind by the tsunami.

The Topos' first venture into Europe to Abruzzo, Italy, after the earthquake there in April 2009.

The group participated in efforts after the 2010 Haiti earthquake. The first group of six left on 14 January for the country from Cancún. The initial group went to assess the situation with later groups, including the canine unit going later. The Topos rescued 15 people alive in the capital.

As of January 2010, no volunteer has died on duty.
