= Palau Reial Major =

Palace in Barcelona, Catalonia, Spain

Coordinates: 41°23′2.99″N 2°10′39.24″E

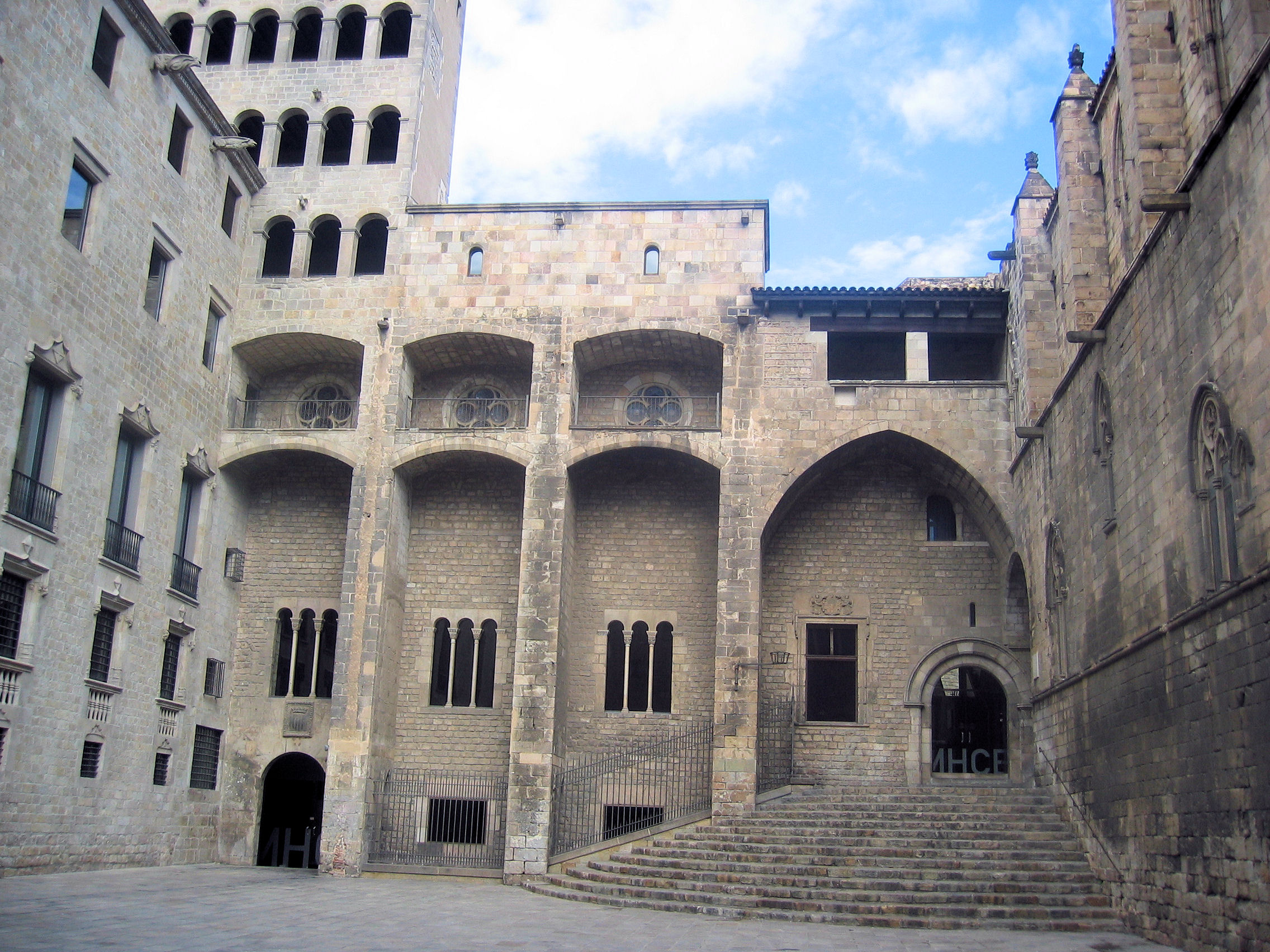
Façade of the palace

The Palau Reial Major (Catalan pronunciation: [pəˈlaw rəˈjal məˈʒo]; "Grand Royal Palace") is a complex of historic buildings located in Plaça del Rei, Barcelona, Catalonia, Spain. It was the main residence of the counts of Barcelona and later the kings of Aragon until the mid 15th century. It is composed of three distinct edifices:

- the Saló del Tinell, built by King Peter IV in 1359–1362
- the Palatine Chapel of St. Agatha (1302), built under King James II
- the Palau del Lloctinent (1549), built by Generalitat of Catalonia under Charles V

The Saló del Tinell was built in the 14th century under the direction of architect Guillem Carbonell. Its gothic round arches are founded over 11th-century vaults (built themselves over a pre-existing monumental structure dating to the Visigoth age). The Chapel of St. Agatha was designed by architect Bertran Riquer to act as the royal chapel, replacing a previous oratory. It has an octagonal tower from the early 14th century, and it consists of a single aisle with a roof ceiling and ends with a polygonal apse. The sacristy is built within the ancient Roman walls. By commission of Peter V of Aragon (1463–1466) painter Jaume Huguet made the chapel altarpiece dedicated to the Epiphany.

Both Saló del Tinell and St. Agatha Chapel are valued as Catalan Gothic architecture masterpieces. The Epiphany altarpiece is also an outstanding gothic painting. They can be visited as a part of the Barcelona City History Museum MUHBA. Temporary exhibitions are held in them.

After the 16th century, the edifice was no longer used as a royal residence and was divided between the Inquisition and the royal administration. In this period, the door leading to the Royal Audience Hall was built, with a triangular tympanum (currently at the entrance of the Museu Frederic Marès).

The Palau de Lloctinent was built in 1549–1557 by Antoni Carbonell, in late Gothic-Renaissance style as the residence of the Viceroy (Lloctinent) of Catalonia. Also from this period is the so-called Mirador of King Martin, a five-storey tower on a rectangular plan (1555).

== Gallery ==
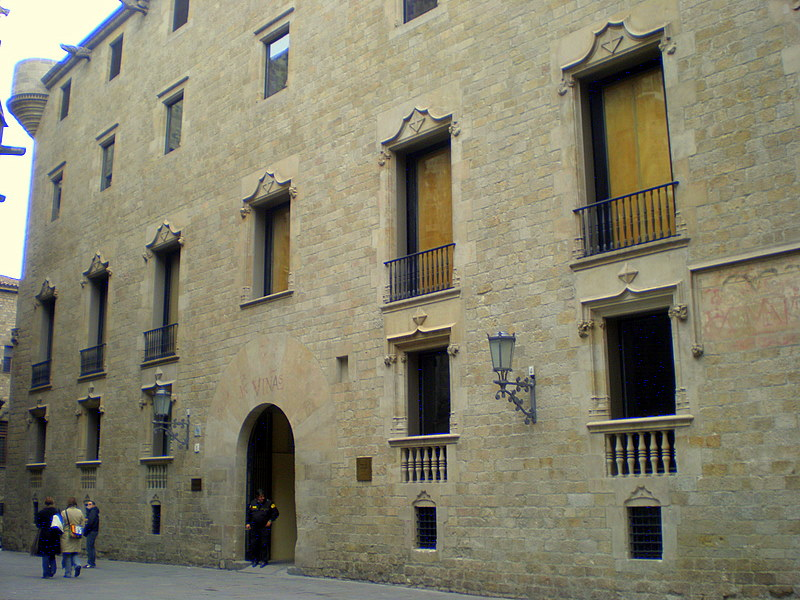
Palau del Lloctinent

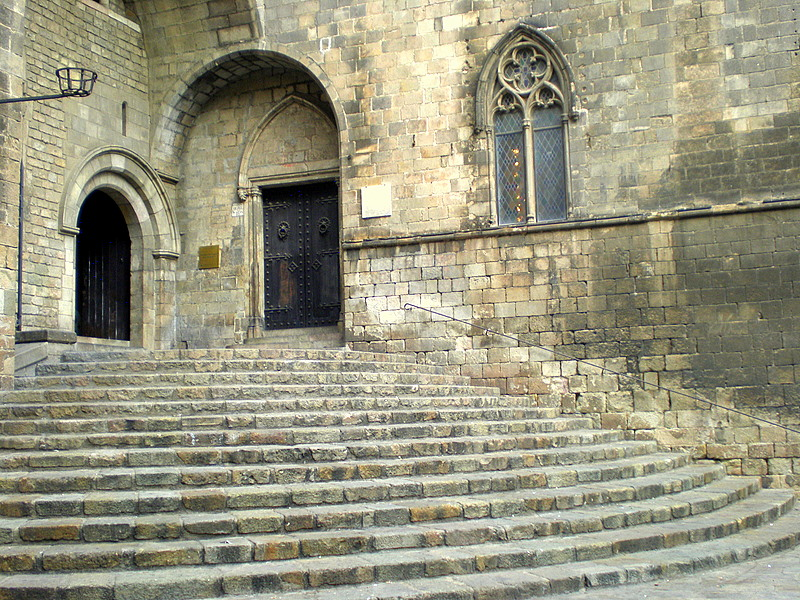
Steps leading to the Saló del Tinell and the Chapel of St. Agatha

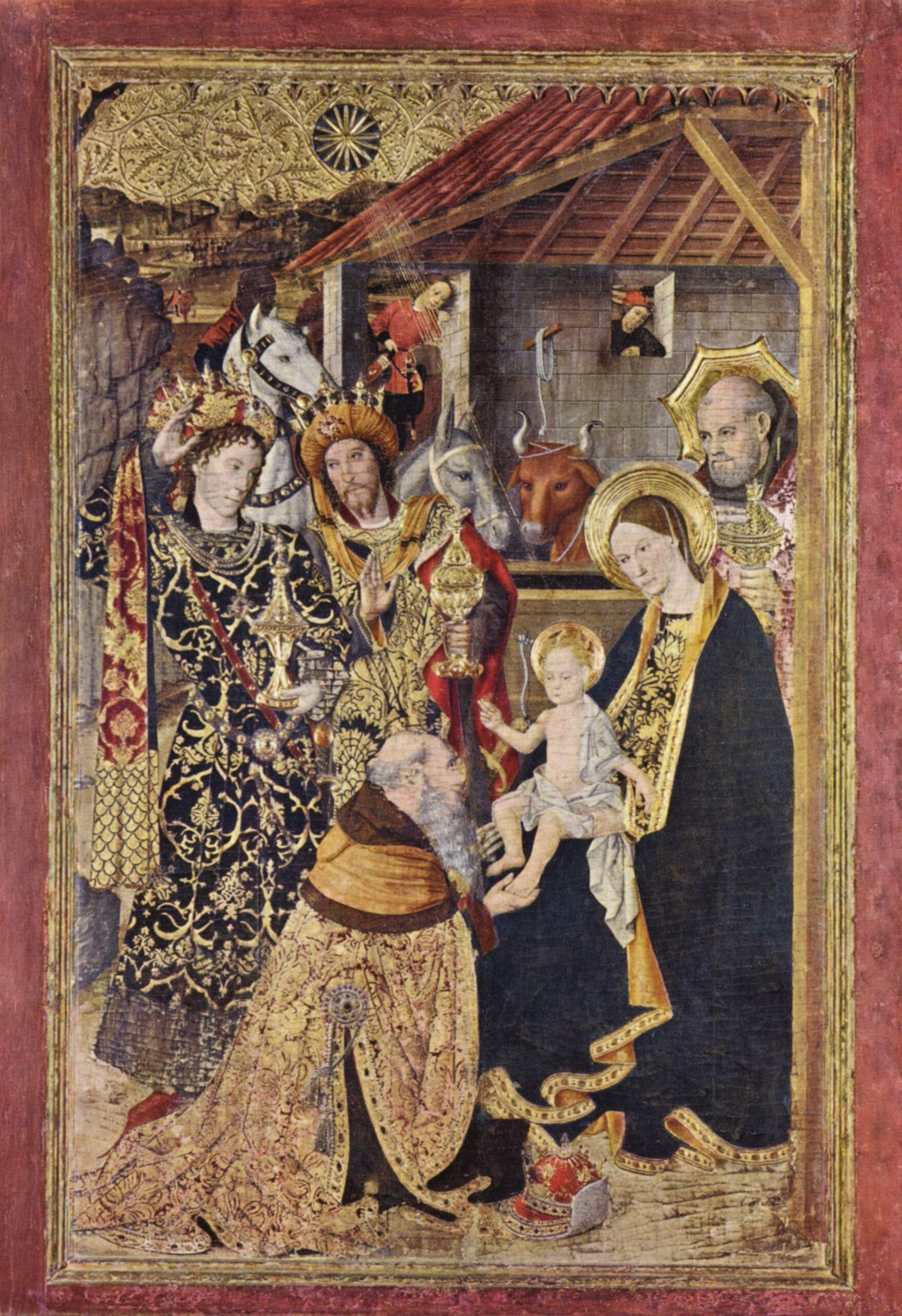
The altarpiece of the Epiphany, by Jaume Huguet
