= Casa Padellàs =

Gothic palace in Barcelona, Spain

Coordinates: 41.3838°N 2.1779°E

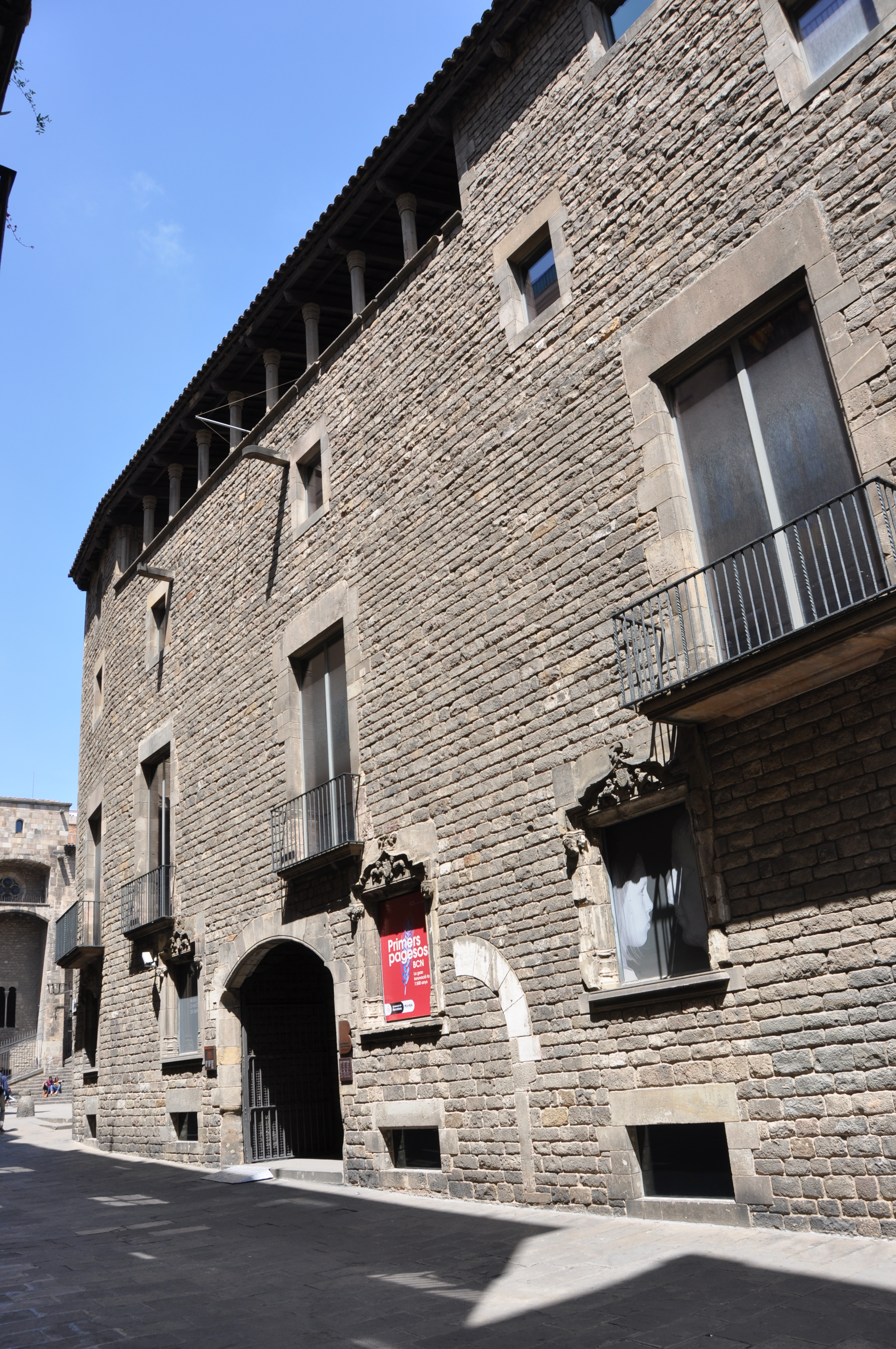
MUHBA- Padellas's House.350002

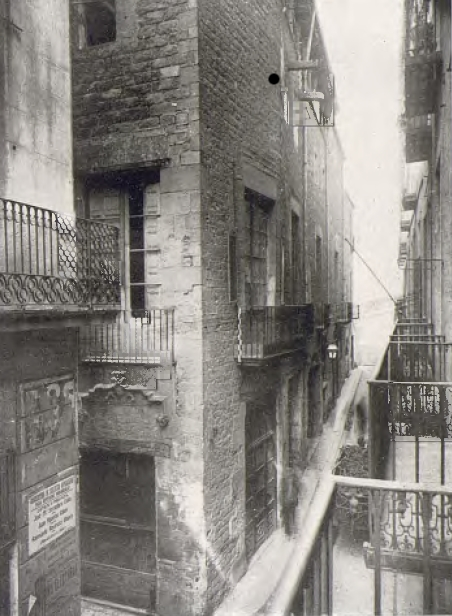
The building in its original location

The Casa Padellàs (English: Padellàs's House) is a Gothic palace, originally located at number 25, Carrer Mercaders, in Barcelona. Due to the construction of the Via Laietana in the early 20th century—which otherwise would have destroyed it—the building was disassembled in 1931 and relocated to the Plaça del Rei, in Barcelona's Gothic Quarter. Since 1943, it has been home to the Barcelona City History Museum, and it is catalogued since 1962 as a Cultural Asset of National Interest (Bé Cultural d’Interès Nacional) with B grade, and its urban qualification is 7a(p).

== Architecture ==
Its design obeys to the most common organization of Catalan Gothic palaces. The façade is plain, without a special emphasis on decoration. The windows display some Renaissance decorative motifs below, with the upper windows only opened in the late 18th century. Otherwise, the building's exterior is only pierced by the main portal, which gives access to the building's central court—the nucleus of the residence. Within this space is the present-day Barcelona City History Museum entrance, a well, and the main staircase which wraps around the patio to access the piano nobile. The court is surrounded by an arcade of Gothic arches at this level, with another gallery above this supporting the roof.

Inside the building, rooms are adapted to its current function and used as exhibition spaces. Its original decoration was not preserved during the deconstruction, reconstruction, and relocation of the building.

== History ==
From medieval hearth tax records, it can be deduced that the Palau Padellàs was built between 1497 and 1515 at the intersection of the Carrer Mercaders and Carrer Tarascó. The project was likely undertaken by Joan d’Hostalric-Sabastida i Llull, royal counselor and governor of the counties of Rosselló and Cerdanya, who was ennobled in 1513.

In 1584 it became property of the Casamitjana family, and one of its inhabitants was the Head Counselor of Barcelona, Rafael Casamitjana d’Erill (1651). Eventually, its owners changed again, and during the eighteenth century, it became property of the Padellàs family, from who it received the name it still bears today. Francesc de Padellàs defended Barcelona during the War of the Spanish Succession, but when defeat of the city was imminent, he changed side and supported the Bourbon cause. In 1759, its son, Bernardí de Padellàs, was ennobled by Charles III of Spain. In the early decades of the 20th century, the house's ownership changed hands several times until 1928, when it was acquired by the City of Barcelona. After its relocation of 1931 and the conclusion of the Spanish Civil War (1936–1939), it was decided to convert the Palau Padellàs into the Barcelona City History Museum headquarters.

== Temporary exhibitions ==
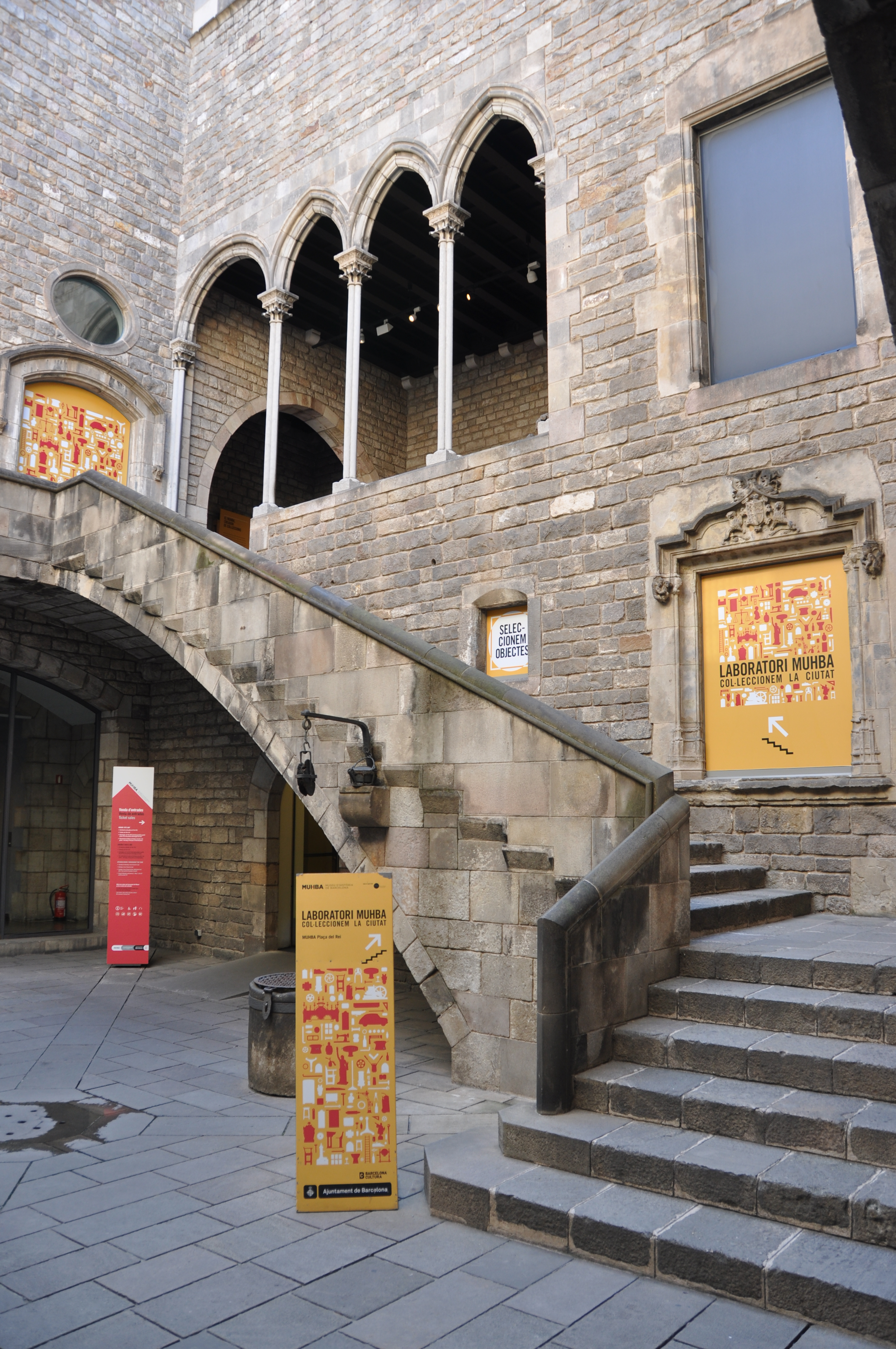
Court of the Casa Padellàs

Today the Palau Padellàs is one of the principal exhibition spaces of MUHBA (Barcelona City History Museum). Since 1996, it has hosted several notable exhibitions:

- Barcelona en temps dels Àustries. La vida a la ciutat en el Renaixement i el Barroc. 1492-1714. (22/03/1996 to 19/04/1998).
- 1939. Barcelona Any Zero. Història gràfica de l'ocupació de la ciutat (22/04/1998 to 30/11/1999).
- Despert entre adormits. Joan Maragall i la fi de segle a Barcelona (04/12/1998 to 14/02/1999).
- La construcció de la gran Barcelona. L'obertura de la Via Laietana 1908-1958 (18/05/2001 to 30/09/2001).
- Verdaguer i Gaudí. Tradició i modernitat a la Barcelona del canvi de segle, 1878-1912 (08/03/2002 to 09/06/2002).
- La condició humana. El somni d'una ombra (10/05/2004 to 26/09/2004).
- ABAJO LAS MURALLAS!!! 150 anys de l'enderroc de les muralles de Barcelona (19/11/2004 to 31/10/2005).
- GATPAC.1928-1939. Una arquitectura nova per a una nova ciutat (19/05/2006 to 18/10/2006).
- Juan Negrín (1892-1956). Barcelona, capital de la República (21/07/2007 to 04/11/2007).
- Barraques. La ciutat informal (18/07/2009 to 26/04/2009).
- Barcelona i els Jocs Florals, 1859. Modernització i romanticisme (9/11/2009 to 01/01/2010).
- Ja tenim 600! La represa sense democràcia. Barcelona 1947-1973 From (19/11/2010 to 26/06/2011).
- Laboratori MUHBA. Col·leccionem la ciutat (7/11/2011 until 2014).
- Primers pagesos BCN. La gran innovació fa 7.500 anys (2016).
