= Architecture of Barcelona =

The architecture of Barcelona evolved in parallel to that of Catalan and Spanish architecture as a whole. Influences on the city's architecture include the fist Iberian settlers, through the Roman colonizers, the Visigoths, and a brief Islamic period, until the emergence in the Middle Ages of Catalan art, language and culture. The Romanesque and Gothic were fruitful periods for the artistic development of the region.

== History ==
During the Modern Age, when the Barcelona City was linked to the Hispanic Monarchy, the main styles were the Renaissance and the Baroque, developed from foreign styles coming from Italy and France. These styles were applied with various local variants, and although some authors claim that it was not a particularly splendid period, the quality of the works was in line with that of the state as a whole.

The nineteenth century led to a certain economic and cultural revitalization, which reflected in one of the most fruitful periods in the city's architecture, Modernisme. Until the nineteenth century, Barcelona was corseted by its walls of medieval origin, being considered a military place, so its growth was limited. The situation changed with the demolition of the walls and the donation to the city of the Parc de la Ciutadella, which led to the expansion of the city along the adjoining plain, a fact that was reflected in the Eixample project designed by Ildefons Cerdà. This was the largest territorial expansion of Barcelona. Another significant increase in the area of the city was the annexation of several bordering municipalities between the late nineteenth and early twentieth centuries. All this meant the adaptation of the new urban spaces and an increase in municipal artistic commissions on public roads, which were also favored by various events held in the city such as the Universal Exhibition of 1888 and the International of 1929 or, more recently, for the Olympic Games of 1992 and the Universal Forum of the Cultures of 2004.

The twentieth century began with the updating of the various styles produced by Barcelonian architects, which connected with international currents. The architectural development in recent years and the commitment to design and innovation, as well as the link between urban planning, ecological values, and sustainability, have turned Barcelona into one of the most cutting-edge European cities in the architectural field, which has been recognized with numerous awards and distinctions such as the Royal Gold Medal of the Royal Institute of British Architects (RIBA) in 1999 and the prize of the Venice Biennale in 2002.

The architectural heritage of the city enjoys a special protection in virtue of the Law 9/1993 of the Catalan Cultural Heritage, that guarantees the protection, conservation, research and diffusion of the cultural heritage, with several degrees of coverage: level To (Cultural Good of National Interest), level B (Cultural Good of Local Interest), level C (Good of Interest Urbanístic) and level D (Good of Documentary Interest).

== Antiquity ==
=== Prehistory ===
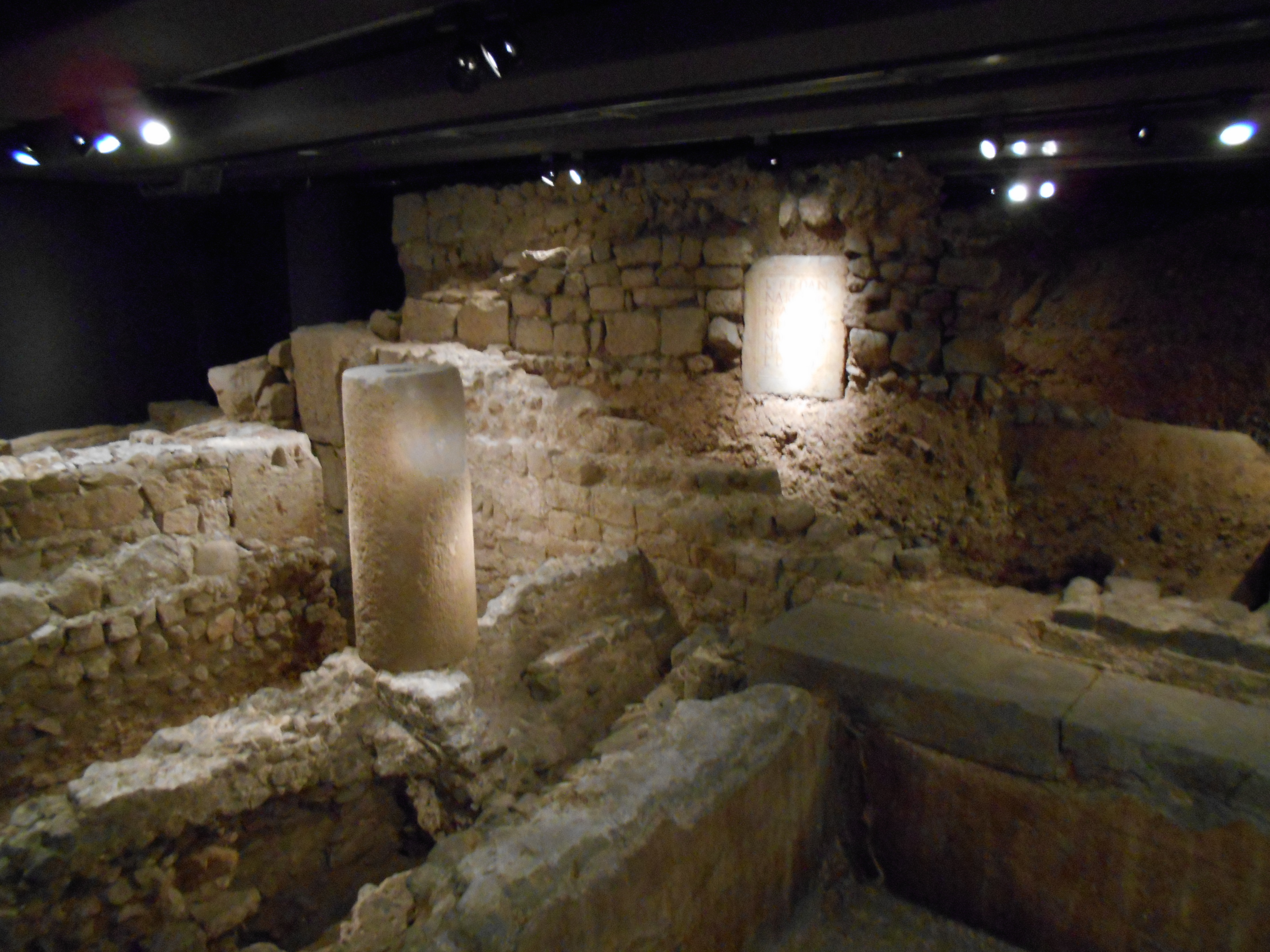
Roman archaeological remains, Museum of the History of Barcelona

There is scarce vestiges of prehistoric period to the city. If well it is ascertained the human presence in the Paleolithic, the first rests regarding the architecture proceed of the Neolithic, period in which the human being went back sedentary and happened of a subsistència based in the hunting and the recol·lecció to an agrarian economy and farmer. These first vestiges proceed of finals of the Neolític (3500 - 1800 BC), and manifest mainly for the practices funeràries with sepulcres of pit, that were used to be of quite a lot depth and revestides of slabs. An exponent thereof is the grave discovered the 1917 to the spilling southwest of the hill of Monterols, between the streets of Muntaner and Copèrnic; of imprecise dating, has 60 cm of high and 80 of wide, and was formed by slabs flat of irregular shape. Regarding habitacles, of this period only has found a bottom of cabin in what is the current station of Saint Andreu Comtal.

Of the Bronze Age (1800–800 BC) there is equally few rests regarding the plan of Barcelona. The main proceed of a jaciment discovered the 1990 to the street of Saint Pau, where have found rests of fireplaces and sepultures of inhumació individual. Also they are surely of this period the rests found the 1931 to Can Casanoves, behind the Hospital of Saint Pau, where have found rests of walls of stone and the bottoms of three circular cabins of some 180 cm of diameter. They exist for other band witnesses written of two megalithic monuments, situated in Montjuïc and Field of the Harp, of those that nevertheless has not remained any rastre material. Finally, of the calcolític final there are some scarce rests of the called «culture of the fields of urns», found to the farm of Can Don Joan, to Horta, and to the south slope-oriental of the mountain of Montjuïc, between the paths of the Ancient Mill and the Source of the Mamella.

=== Iberian period ===
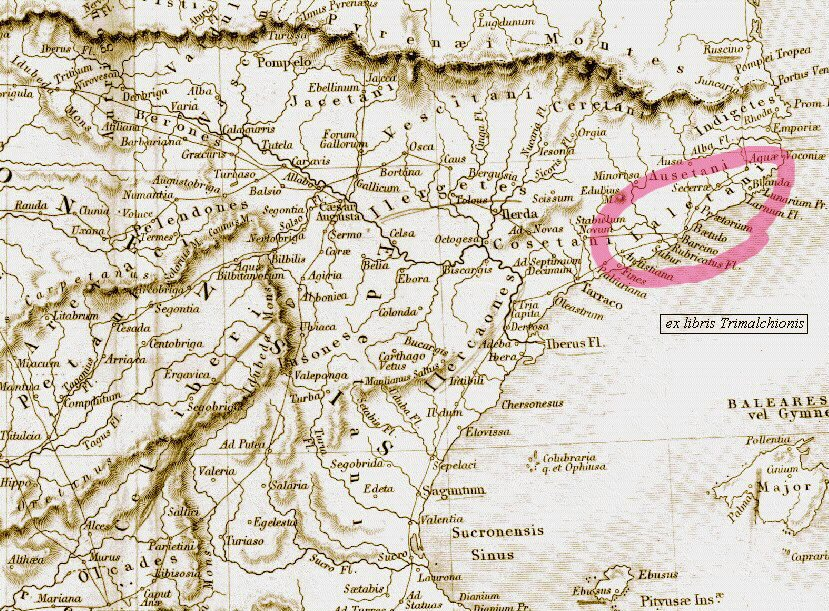
Area inhabited by the Laietani

In the 6th century BC and the 1st century BC the plan of Barcelona was occupied by the Laietani, an Iberian people that occupied the current comarques of the Barcelonès, the Vallès, the Maresme and the Bass Llobregat. The Iberian architecture based in murs of tapial, with a system adovellat, with false arches and turns realised by approach of spun. Cities used to be located in acropolis, with towers and solid walls for the defence, within which the houses were located, of an irregular distribution, generally with a rectangular plan.

In Barcelona there are hardly any Iberian architectural remains; the main vestiges of this culture were found in the hills of La Rovira, Peira and Putget, as well as in Santa Cruz de Olorde in Tibidabo, but they have not allowed establishing special characteristics with regard to funeral homes or sepulchres. The main remains come from Rovira, where in 1931 vestiges of an Iberian settlement were found that were destroyed when anti-aircraft batteries were installed during the Spanish Civil War. Apparently, it had a wall with two accesses, while located outside the walls there was a set of silos with 44 deposits carved into the rock.

The main Iberian settlement in the area was in Montjuïc, possibly the 'Barkeno', although the urbanization of the mountain in recent years and its intensive use as a stone quarry throughout the history of the city has caused the loss of most remains. In 1928, nine large capacity silos were discovered in the Magòria area, which would probably be part of an agricultural surplus warehouse. On the other hand, in 1984 remains of a settlement were found on the southwest slope of the mountain, on a plot of about 2 or 3 hectares.

=== Roman period ===
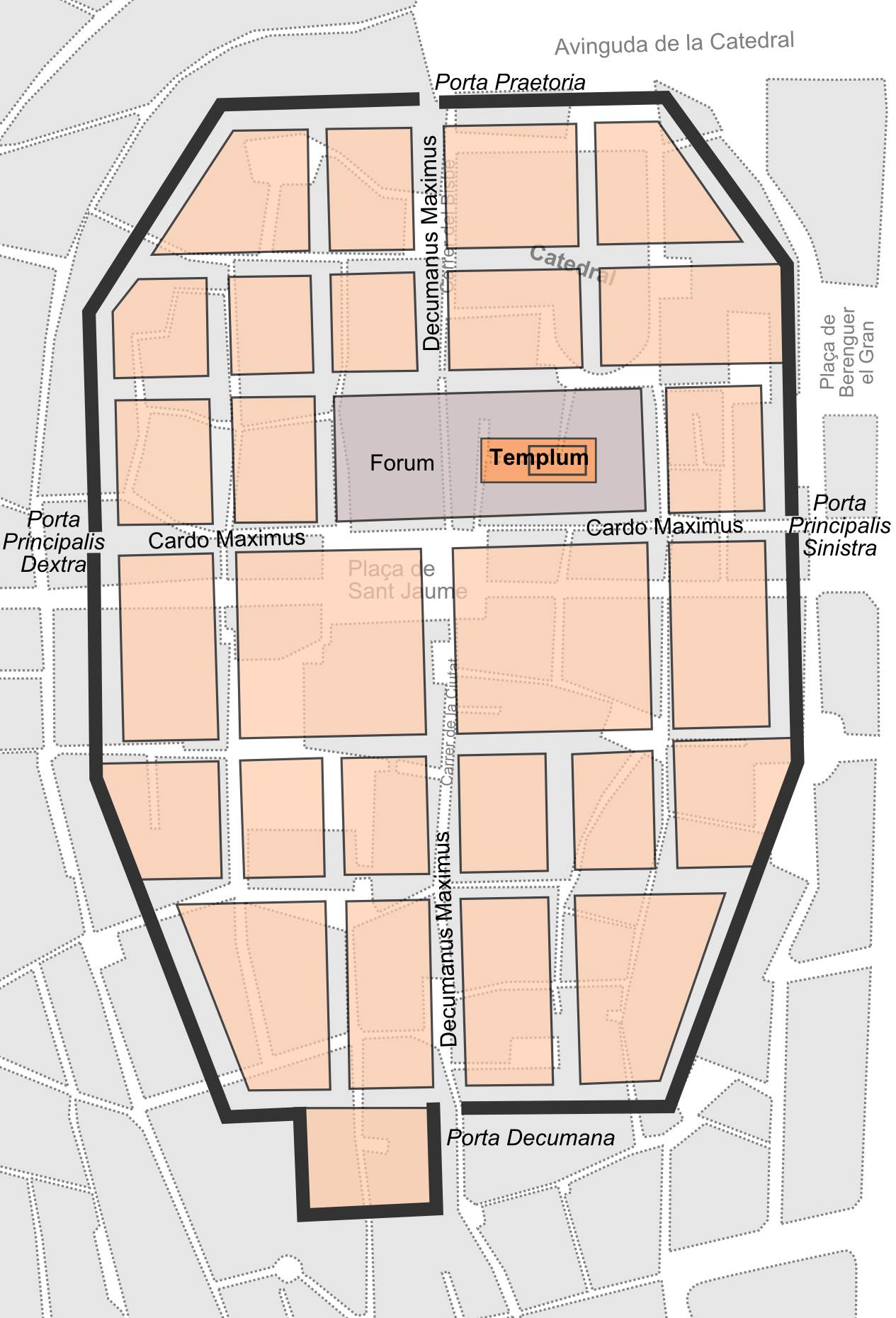
Map of Barcino superimposed on the current plan of the Gothic Quarter.

In the third century BC C. the Romans arrived in the Iberian peninsula and began a colonization process that culminated in the incorporation of all Hispania into the Roman Empire. In the 1st century BC Barcino (Roman Barcelona) was founded, a small walled town that took the urban form of castrum and later oppidum. The Romans were great experts in civil architecture and engineering and provided roads, bridges, aqueducts and cities with a rational layout and basic services such as sewers.

The Barcino quarter was walled, with a perimeter of 1.5 km, which protected an area of 10.4 hectares. The first city wall, of simple factory, began to be built in the 1st century BC. It had few towers, only at the angles and at the gates of the walled perimeter. However, the first incursions of francs and Alamani from the 250s raised the need to reinforce the walls, which were extended in the fourth century. The new wall was built on the bases of the first, and was formed by a double wall of 2.4 metres, with space in half filled with stone and mortar. The wall consisted of 74 towers about 18 meters high, mostly rectangular.

The center of the city was the forum, the main square dedicated to public life and commerce. It was located at the intersection of the cardus maximus (Llibreteria and Call streets) and the decumanus maximus (Bisbe, Ciutat, and Regomir streets), approximately in the center of the walled enclosure. In the forum were concentrated the buildings dedicated to commerce, justice, the baths, and other public structures, and it was the place where the authorities met in the Curia and the Basilica. The boundaries of the forum have not been clearly defined, but it appears to roughly correspond to the present-day Plaça de Sant Jaume. In the forum stood the Temple of Augustus, the first emperor and founder of Roman Barcino.

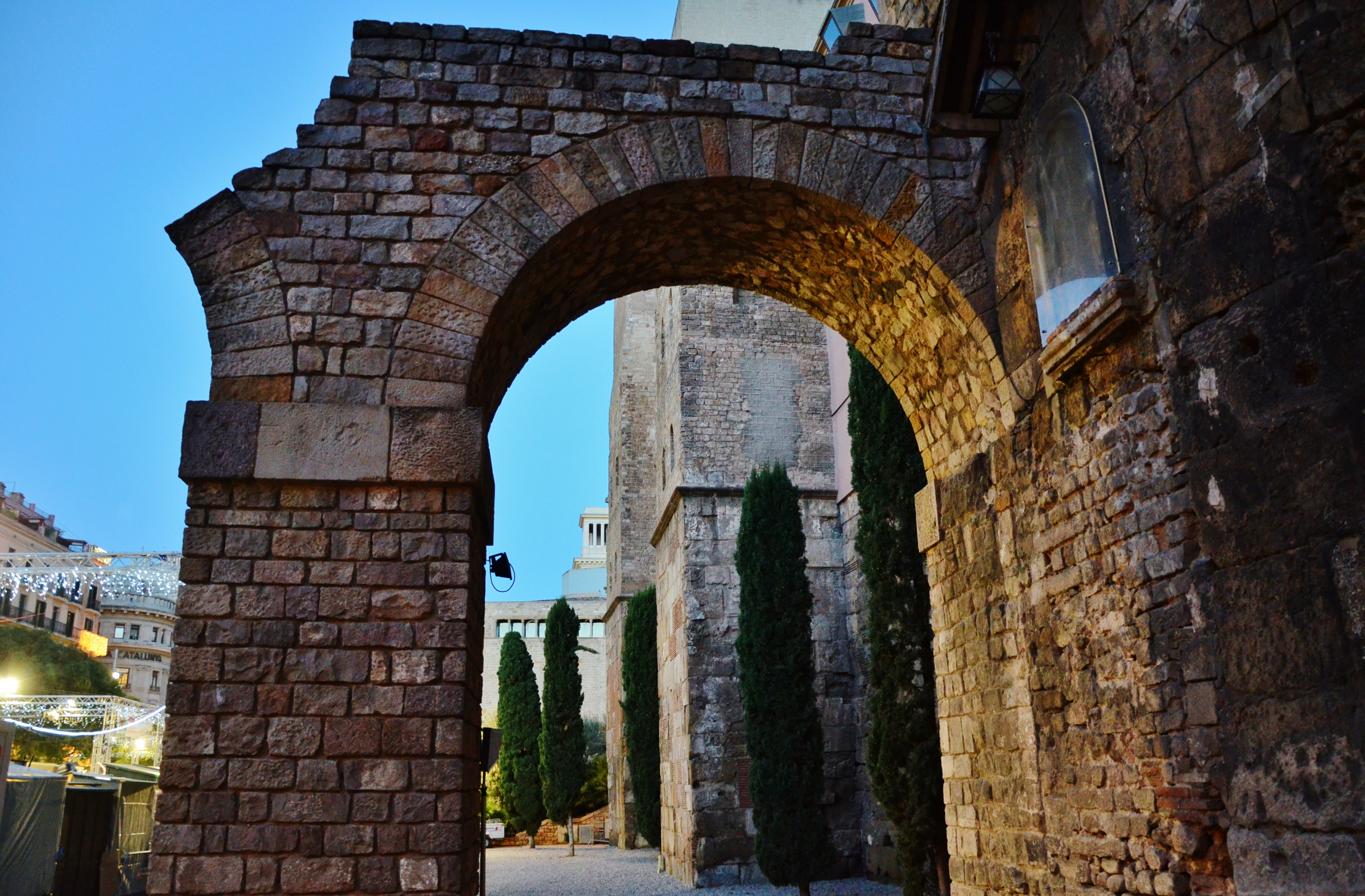
Remains of the Roman aqueduct, 1st century.

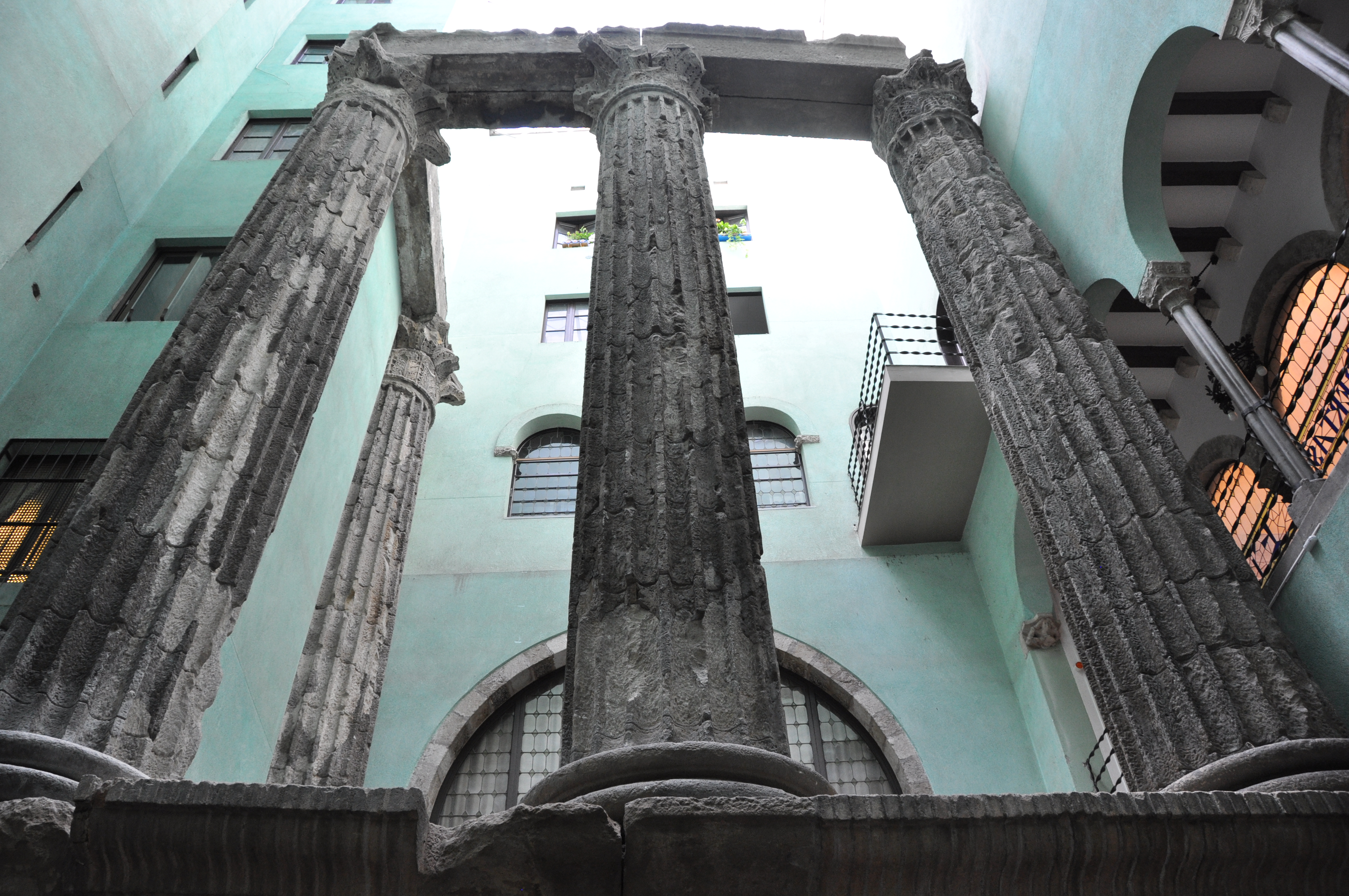
The remaining columns of the Temple of Augustus.

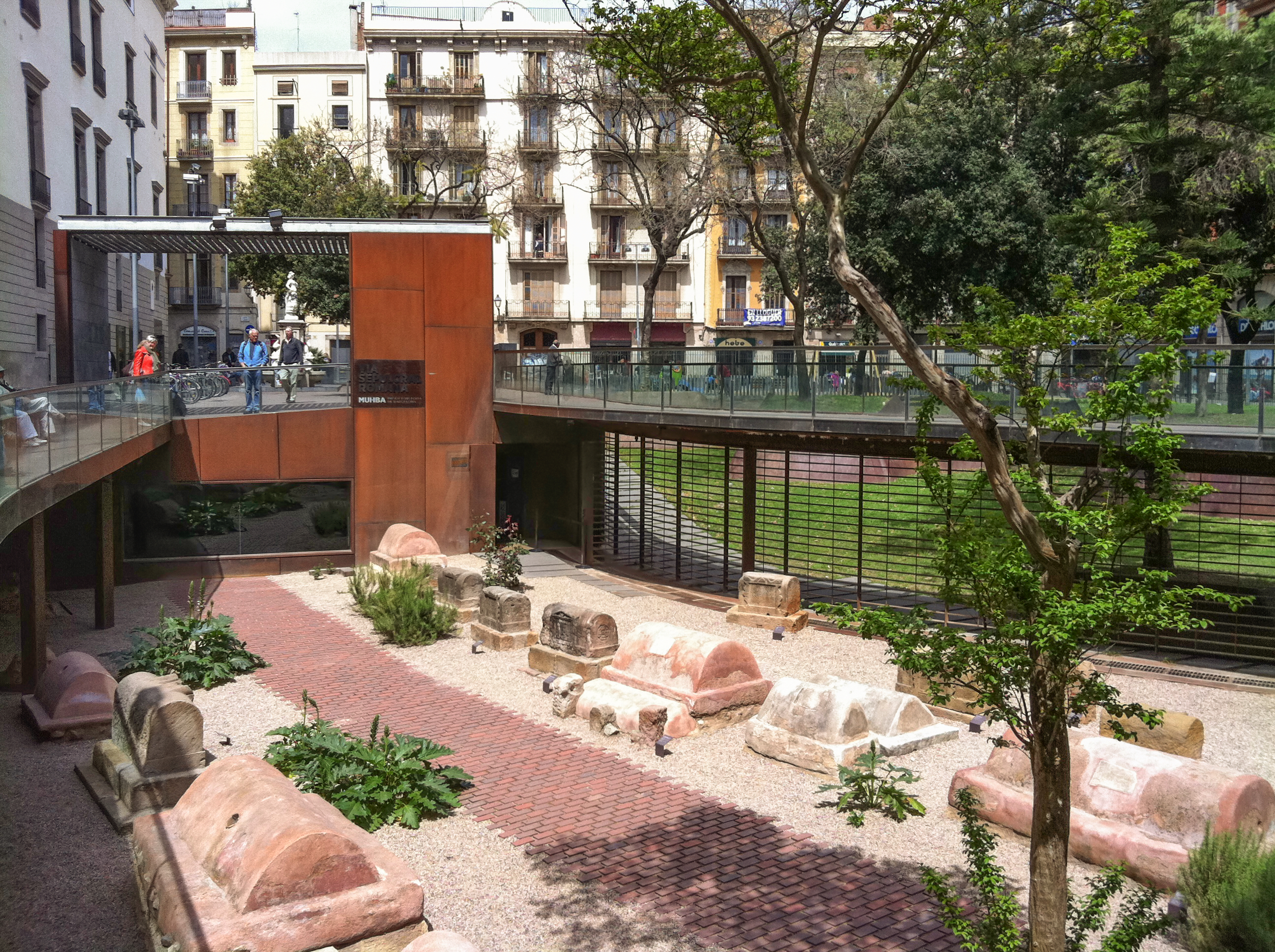
Roman tombs in the Plaça de la Vila de Madrid.

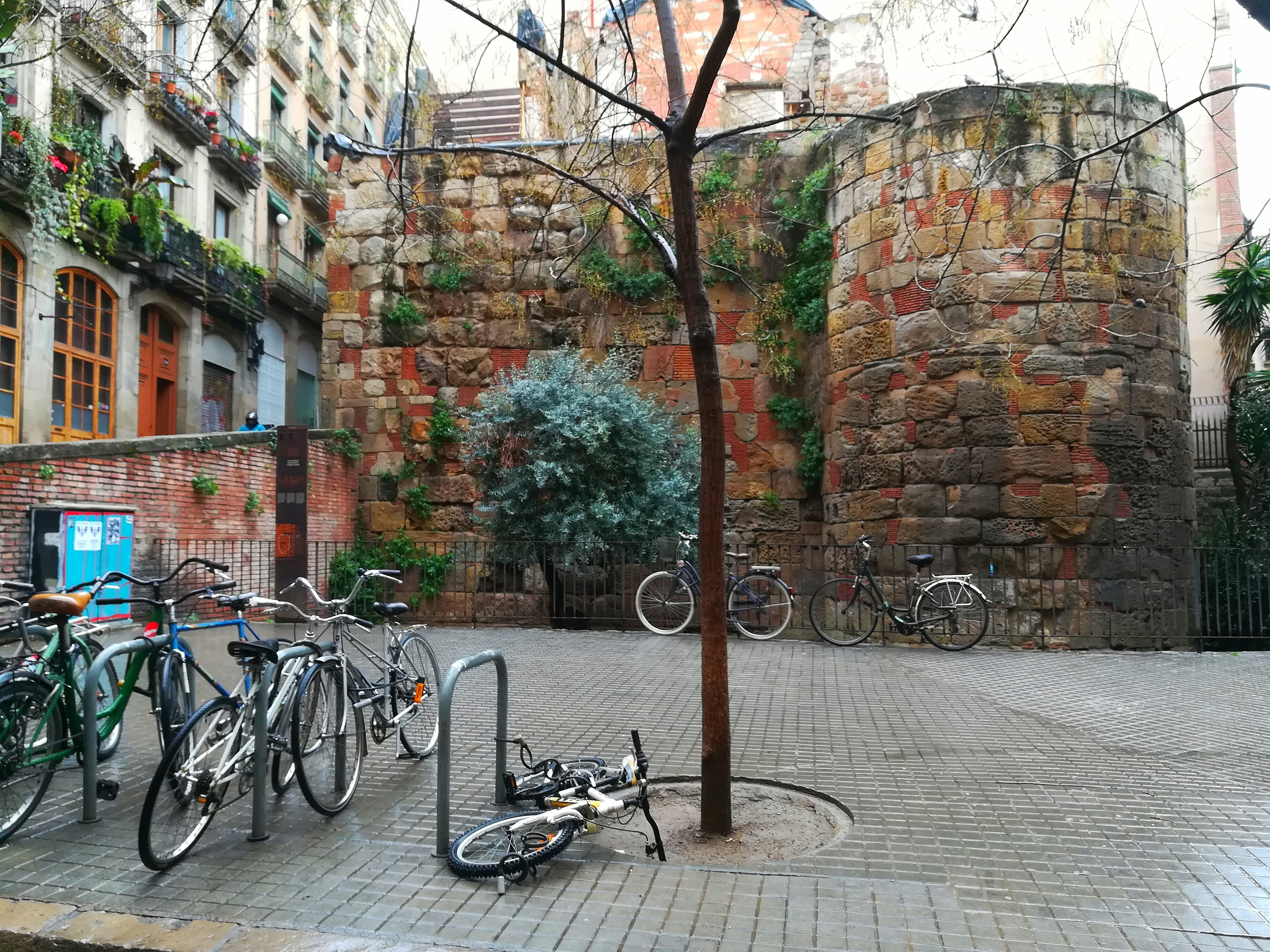
Remains of the Roman wall in Plaça dels Traginers.

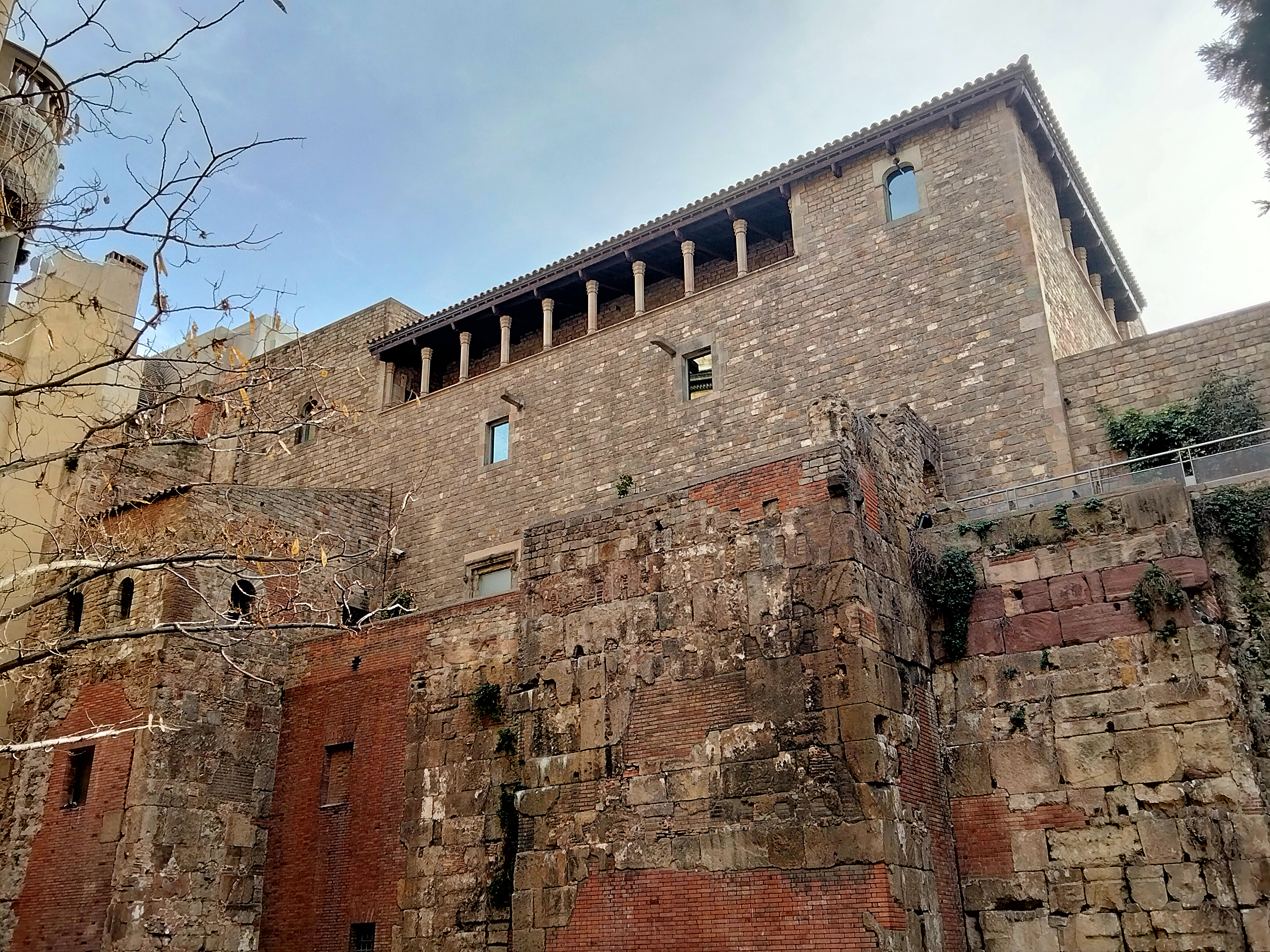
Remains of the Roman wall in Carrer de la Tapineria.

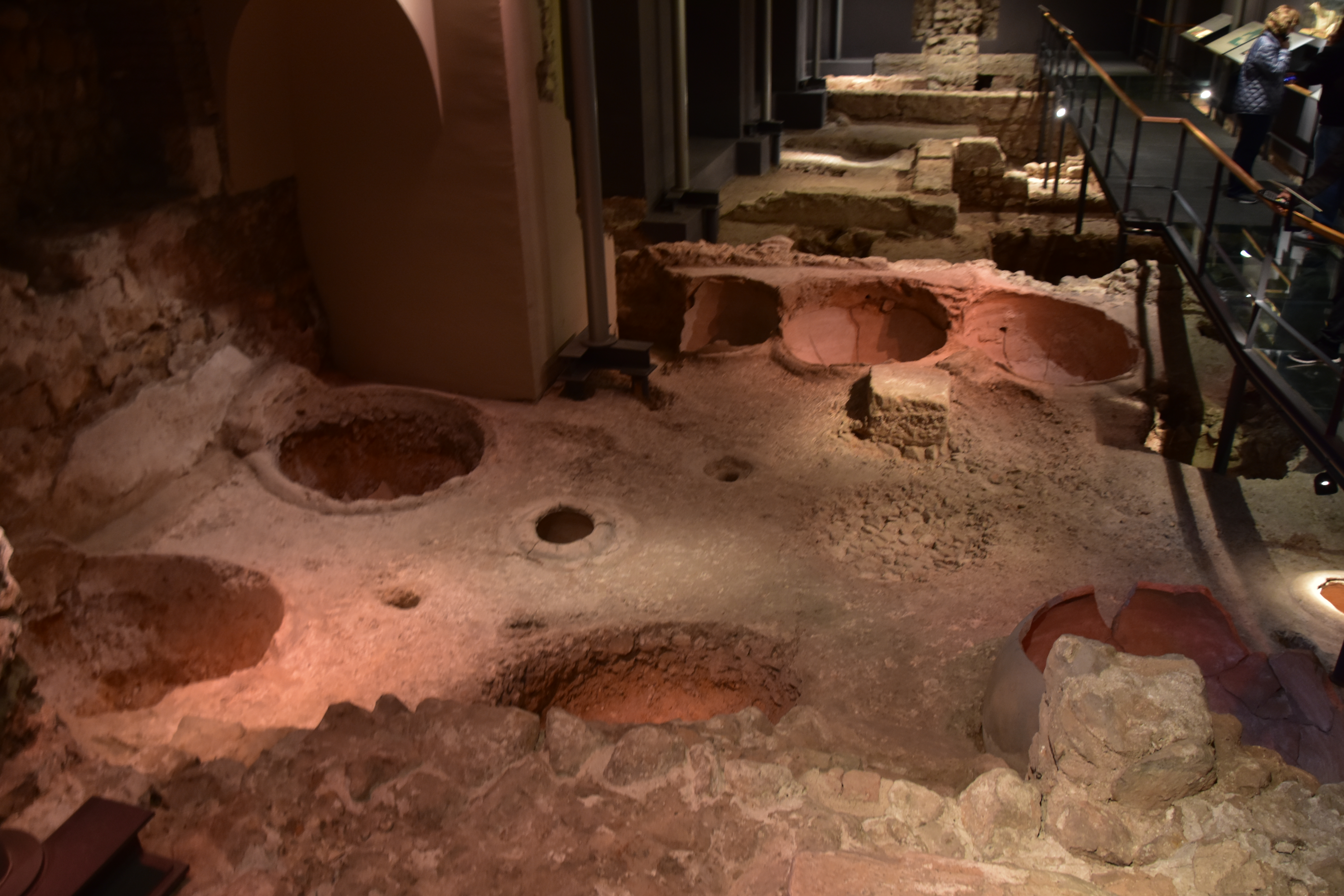
Roman ruins in the Museum of the History of Barcelona.

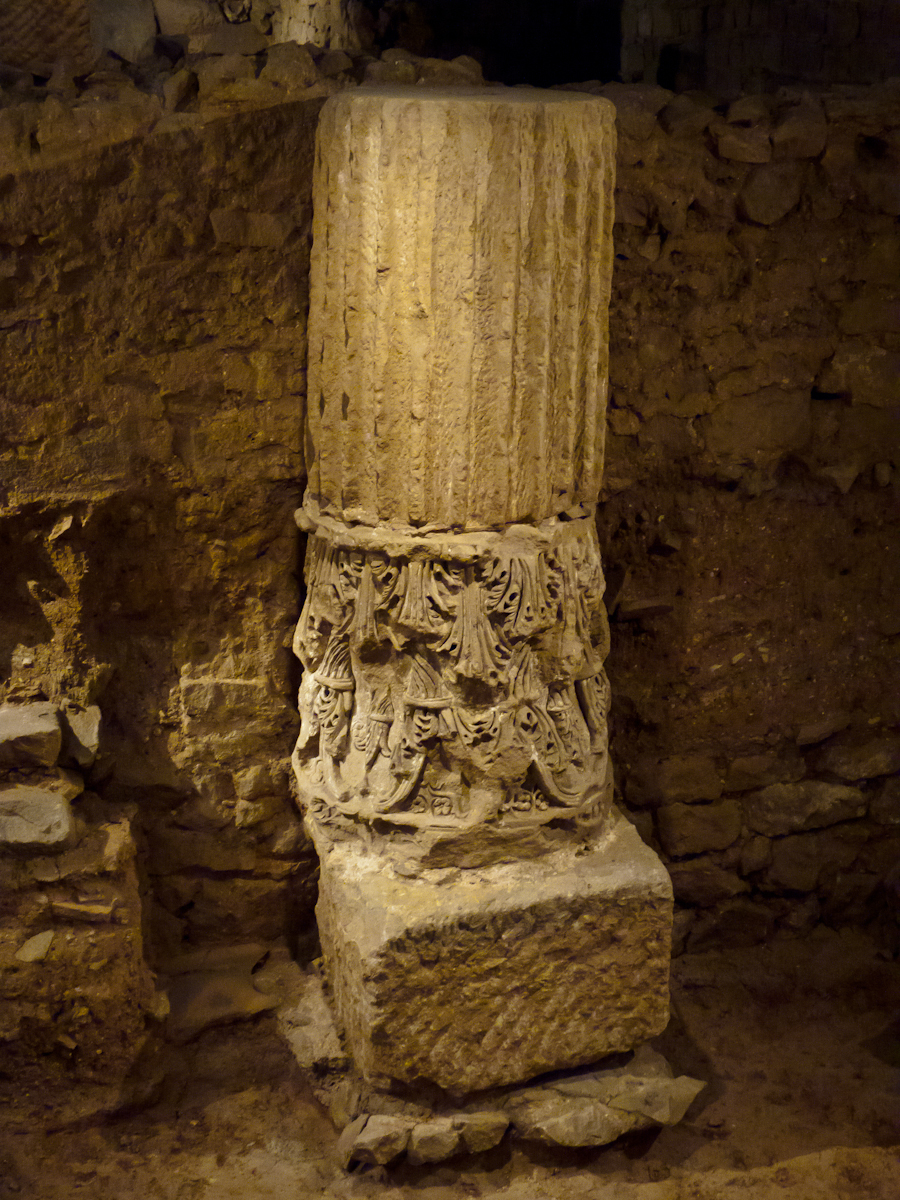
Remains of a Roman column in the Museum of the History of Barcelona.

== See also ==
- Josep Massanès i Mestres
- Parks and gardens of Barcelona
- Street furniture in Barcelona
- Cerdà Plan
- Urban planning of Barcelona
