= Via Sepulcral Romana =

Bien de Interés Cultural in Barcelona, Spain

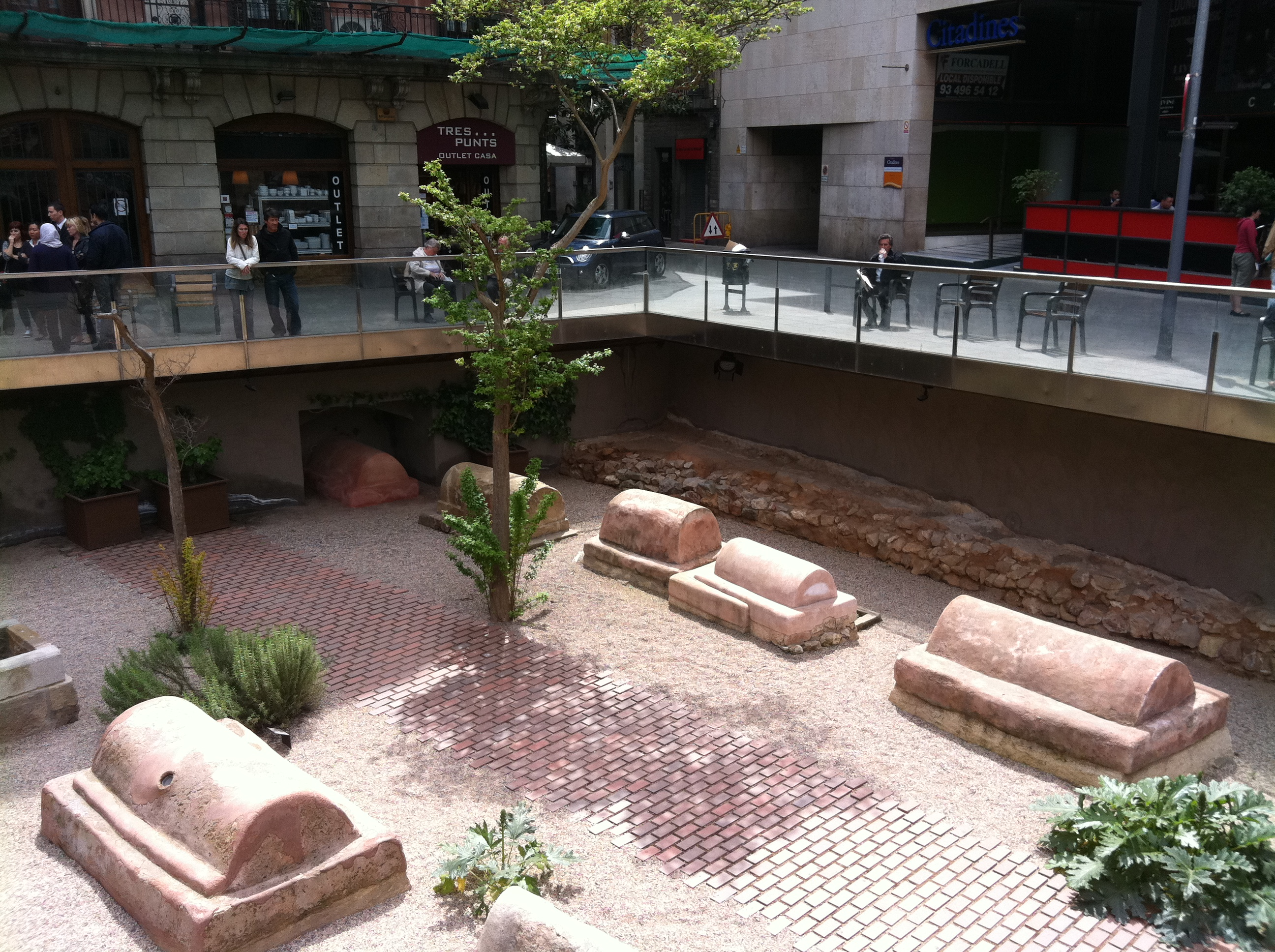
- Bien de Interés Cultural; Patrimonio histórico español
- Place: Barcelona, Catalonia, Spain; Plaça de la Villa de Madrid
- Coordinates: 41°23′03″N 2°10′20″E
- Classification: Archaeological zone
- Identification: RI-55-0000463
- Culture: 1st - 3rd century
- Spain Barcelona

The Via Sepulcral Romana is a Roman necropolis dating from the 1st to the 3rd century AD, located in the Plaça de la Villa de Madrid and its surroundings in Barcelona. The site lies below the current level of the square, but is visible from the street due to the urban design. It is one of the various heritage sites managed by the Museum of the History of Barcelona.

Between the 1st and 3rd centuries, Roman law prohibited burials inside the city, so the necropolises of Barcino were located outside the city walls, along the roads that led out of the city. In this context, the necropolis in the Plaça de la Villa de Madrid is considered to be a secondary cemetery, far from the walls, used for the burial of the middle and lower classes, including slaves and freedmen. However, it is the best preserved and most studied necropolis of this period in Barcelona, as only scattered remains have been found in other necropolises, mostly in the form of reused funerary monuments that were incorporated into the Roman expansion of the city in the 4th century.

The main feature of the necropolis is a five-metre wide road, the remains of which were discovered between the streets of Portaferrissa and Santa Ana. This road left the city through the south-west gate (in the direction of what is now Boqueria street) and led to the Corts or Sarrià areas. The tombs, arranged in rows but not in any regular order, are flanked on the outside by a wall. A total of 85 burials of different types have been identified: six monolithic Cupae, six altars, one stele, two inscribed slabs, 33 burial mounds (two conical and the rest square or masonry cupae), 17 burials protected by tiles or amphorae and 20 burials without any protection. At present, three additional monolithic cupae can be seen in the burial path, brought from the excavations of the Roman wall in the 1950s to replace damaged original masonry cupae in their original positions.

After the necropolis ceased to be used, it was gradually buried by the alluvial deposits of the Collserola streams, which prevented the stones from being reused as building materials. The site was rediscovered in 1956 during the groundwork for the building that now occupies the south-east side of the square, and a first excavation campaign was carried out, followed by another in 1959. Further excavations took place between 2000 and 2003, coinciding with the renovation of the square, and the site was officially opened to the public as a museum in 2008.

The nature of this site lies in the fact that the tombs have been found in their original context, since the vast majority of Roman burials known to us have only reused stone elements from other buildings or isolated tombs. For example, many monolithic cupae have been found in Barcelona (28 in total), but only the six from this burial route have been found in their original location.

== See also ==
- History of Barcelona
- Roman walls of Barcelona
