= Roman walls of Barcelona =

Bien de Interés Cultural in Barcelona, Spain

- Muralla romana de Barcelona (Catalan)
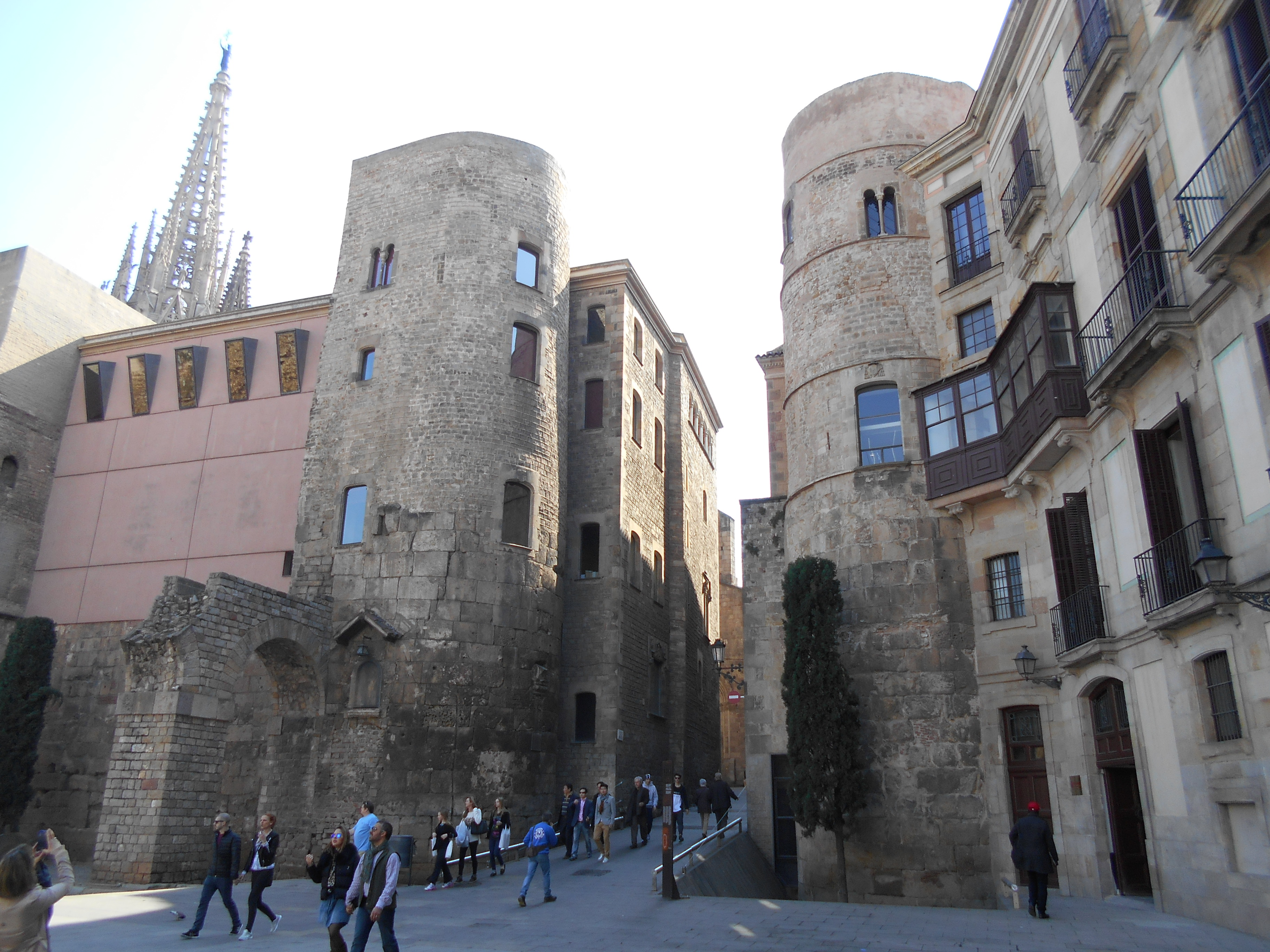
- Portal del Bisbe, the old Praetoria gate of Roman Barcino, with the two defence towers and the remains of the wall and aqueduct.

- Location in Barcelona
- Interactive map of Roman walls of Barcelona
- 41.38405129765895°N 2.175368406715231°E
- Type: City walls
- Location: Gothic Quarter, Ciutat Vella, Barcelona, Catalonia, Spain
- Nearest city: Barcelona

History
- Built: 1st century BC – 4th century AD
- Built for: Defensive fortification
- Original use: City defense
- Demolished: Partially in the 19th century

Site notes
- Area: 10.4 ha (26 acres)
- Architectural style: Roman
- Current use: Historical monument
- Owner: Public
- Website: www.bcn.cat/historia/index_es.htm

Spanish Cultural Heritage
- Official name: Muralla romana de Barcelona
- Type: Non-movable
- Criteria: RI-51-0000417
- Reference no.: RI-51-0000417

The Roman walls of Barcelona (Catalan and Spanish: Muralla romana de Barcelona) are an archaeological and monumental complex comprising the remains of the wall built to protect Barcino—present-day Barcelona—in the time of the Roman Empire. The walls were built between the 1st century BC and the 4th century AD. They are located in the Gothic Quarter, in the Ciutat Vella district of Barcelona.

The monument is listed in the register of Cultural Assets of National Interest (Bé Cultural d'Interès Nacional) of the Catalan government and in the register of Assets of Cultural Interest (Bien de Interés Cultural) of Spanish heritage with the code RI-51-0000417.

== History ==
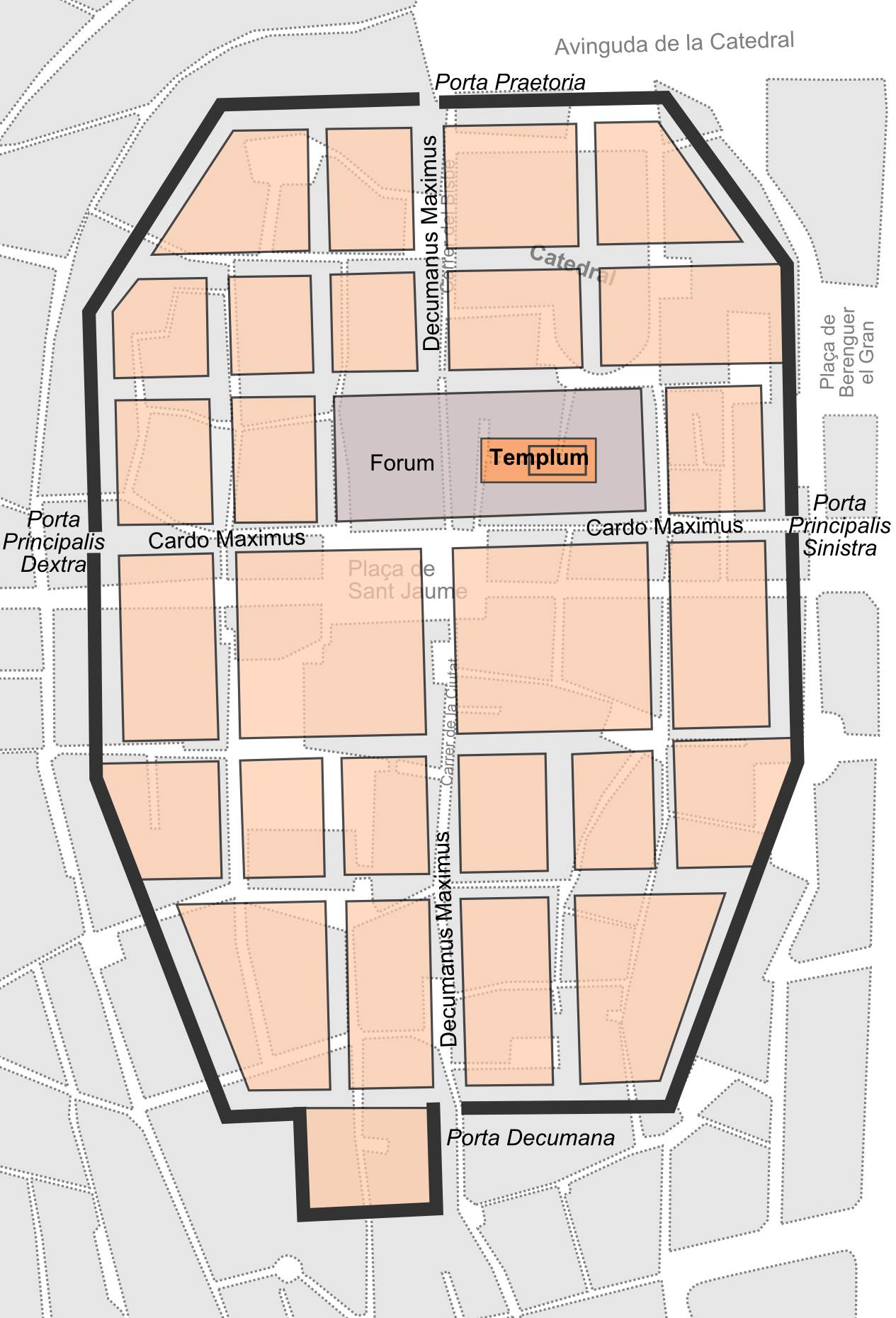
Plan of Barcino superimposed on the present-day plan of the Gothic Quarter.

The Roman Republic first entered the Iberian Peninsula in the course of the Second Punic War (218 BC), to counteract the power of the Carthaginians in the area, which eventually led to the conquest of the territory. This was a slow process, lasting until the year 19 BC, when the Emperor Augustus claimed full control of the peninsula.

The Roman bases of action in the area were initially Emporion and Rhodae (present-day Empúries and Roses), as well as the main Roman foundation in the territory, Tarraco (Tarragona). During this period, the Romans probably occupied the Iberian enclave located at Montjuic, in order to control the mouth of the Llobregat, a strategic centre. It can also be assumed that during this period acculturation took place between the indigenous population and the newcomers.

It appears that it was during the reign of Augustus, between 15 BC and 10 BC, that a small colonia was founded at the location of present-day Barcelona. It was called Barcino probably as a Latinisation of the Iberian name Barkeno. The settlement was located on a small promontory on the Plain of Barcelona near the coast, Mount Tàber (16.9 m above sea level). The main reason for choosing this site must surely have been its natural harbour, although the alluvium of the torrents and the sedimentation of sand from the coastal currents would have made the harbour's draught difficult. The new settlement was given the full name of Colonia Iulia Augusta Faventia Paterna Barcino. The first settlers seem to have been legionaries discharged from the Cantabrian Wars, freedmen from the Narbonensis, and Italic colonists.

Barcino took the urban form of castrum initially, and later oppidum, with the usual organising axes cardo maximus (today's Llibreteria and Call streets) and decumanus maximus (Bisbe, Ciutat, and Regomir streets); at the confluence of both was the forum (near today's Plaça de Sant Jaume), the central square dedicated to public life and business. From this centre, the city followed an orthogonal layout, with square or rectangular blocks laid out in a grid. The strategic role of Barcino, where a major Roman Road, the Via Augusta, met the Mediterranean, gave the city an active commercial and economic development from very early on. The maximum splendour of the Roman period was during the 2nd and 3rd centuries, with a population that must have ranged between 3,500 and 5,000 inhabitants.

=== Post-Roman City ===
The Sack of Barcelona by Almanzor in 985 convinced city leaders to improve their defences, and the four gates of the city were protected with new castles: Castell Vell at today's Plaça de l'Àngel; Castell del Bisbe at Plaça Nova; Castell de Regomir on Carrer Regomir, and Castell Nou, located at the site of today's Ferran and Call streets.

In medieval times, the expansion of the city led to the creation of new neighbourhoods outside the Roman walls, and the city's population continued to grow. By the 13th Century, King James I allowed buildings to be built against the wall, and for windows and openings to be cut through the wall itself. At the same time, in 1260 he ordered a new walled perimeter to be built enclosing the city's suburbs, from the monastery of Sant Pere de les Puel·lesto the Drassanes, facing the sea. Fully enclosed within the city fabric, the Roman wall slowly disappeared, hidden by new construction. A large portion of the walls was also destroyed in the 19th Century.

== Description ==
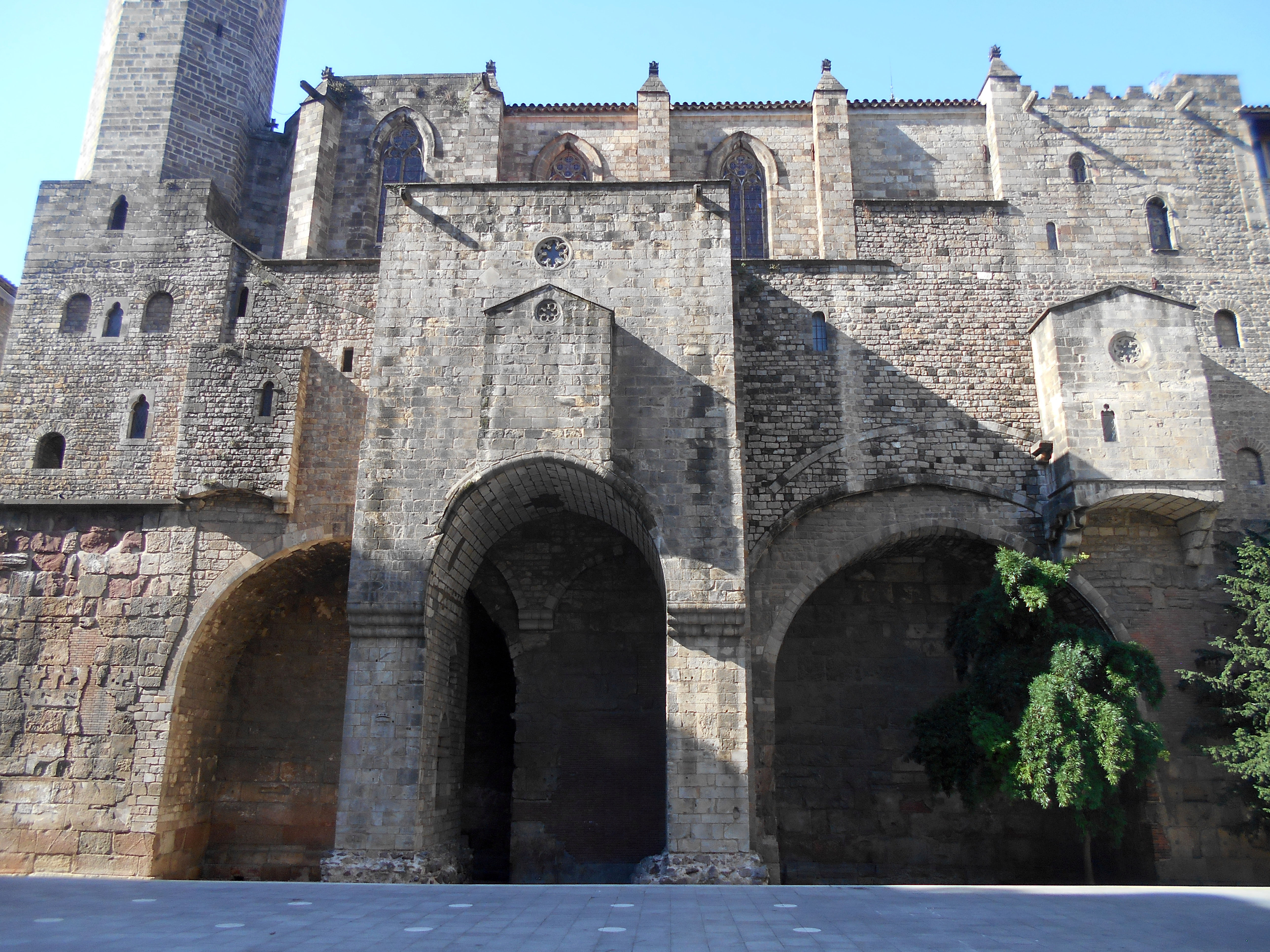
Plaça de Ramon Berenguer el Gran

Barcino was walled, with a perimeter of 1.5 km, protecting an area of 10.4 ha. The city's first wall, of simple construction, was begun in the 1st century BC, with few towers, only at the corners and at the gates of the walled perimeter: the Praetoria (Plaça Nova), the Decumana (Regomir Street), the Principalis Sinistra (Plaça de l'Àngel) and the Principalis Dextra (Carrer del Call). However, the first incursions into Roman lands by Franks and Alemanni, from the 250s onward, led to the need to reinforce the walls. This began in the 4th century, with the new wall built on the foundations of the first. It consisted of a double wall 2 m high, with a space in the middle filled with rubble and mortar. In contrast to the original construction, this new wall had 81 towers, all about 18 m high. Most of these towers had a rectangular base, except for the ten located at the gateways, which were semicircular in plan.

Various remains of the old wall have survived, especially from the northern and eastern sections. The main ones are in the Plaça Nova, where the Praetoria gate was located: two of the towers, part of the perimeter wall and an arcade of the old aqueduct that carried water to the city are preserved here. In later years, the house of el Degà and the house of l'Ardiaca were built on this section. From here, the perimeter continues along Carrer de la Tapineria, where a polygonal tower that formed the northern corner of the enclosure is still preserved; this part of the wall served as a support for the rear wall of the house of Pia Almoina. This section continues in the Plaça de Ramon Berenguer el Gran, where, on top of the Roman wall, there are remains of the medieval wall; on this base stands the Chapel of Santa Àgata. The wall continues along Carrer Sotstinent Navarro, where the Palace of Requesens was built over the wall on a Gothic vault. On Carrer del Correu Vell, there is a circular tower that formed one of the corners of the wall. Another section is visible at Plaça dels Traginers, where another of the towers is preserved. Small remains are preserved on the streets of Regomir, Avinyó, del Call, Banys Nous and Palla, generally inside various private buildings. Some remains of the wall are also preserved in the basement of the Museum of History of Barcelona, as well as the remains of various buildings from Roman Barcino. There are also remains of the old Sea Gate in the Pati Llimona Civic Centre, on Carrer Regomir.

== Gallery ==
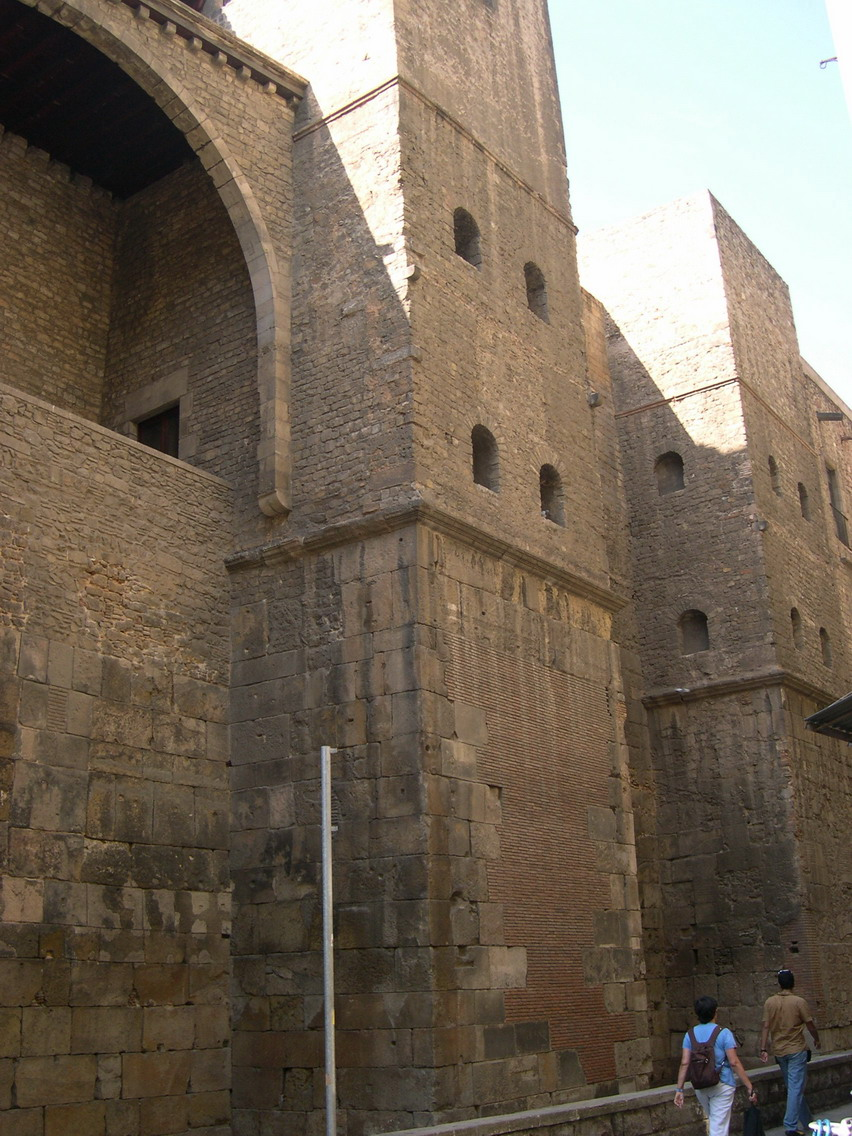
Towers of the wall on Carrer Sots-Tinent Navarro

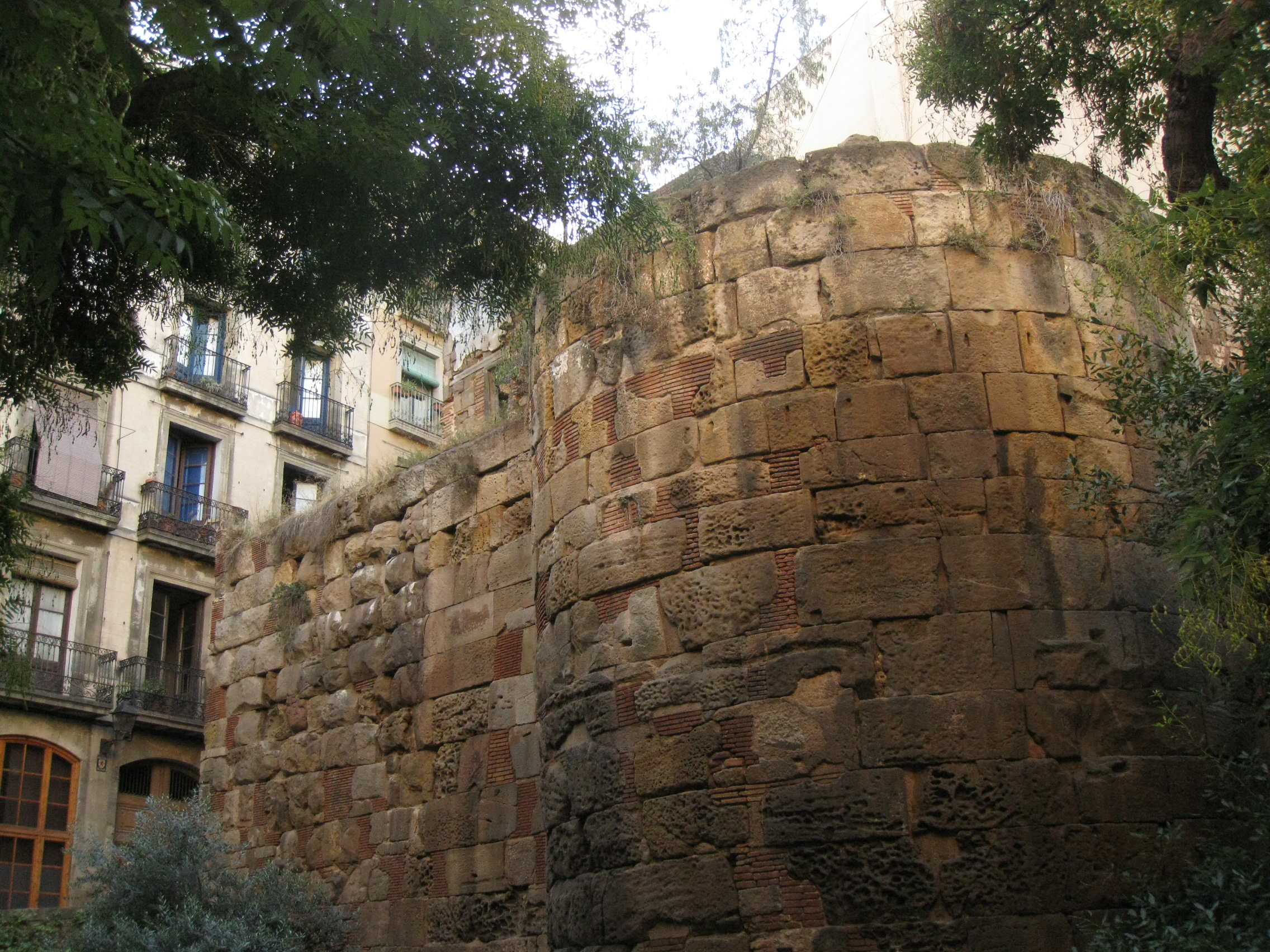
Rounded corner tower of the walls at the Plaça dels Traginers

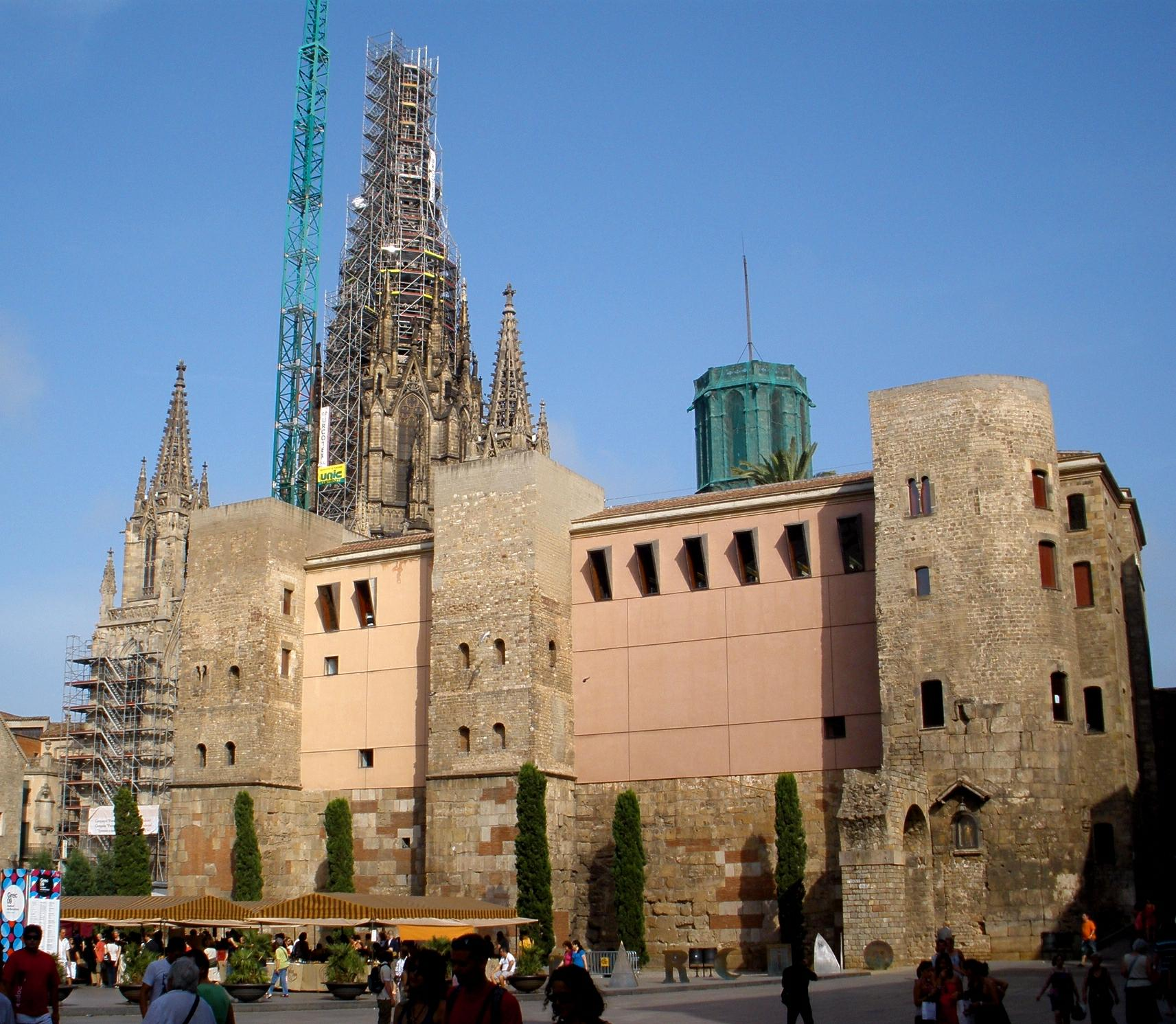
Remains of the wall at the Plaça Nova, with the Casa de l'Ardiaca above

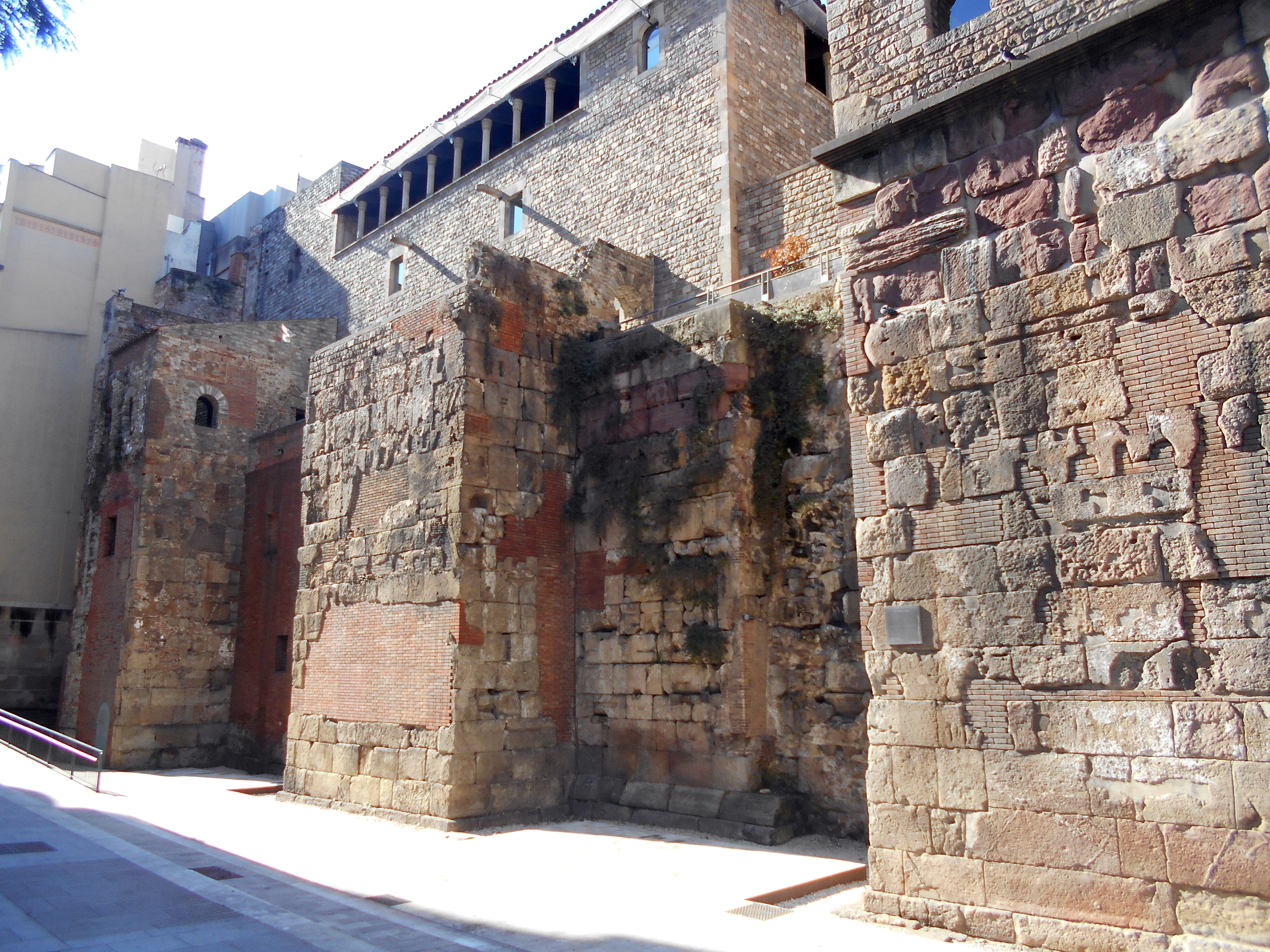
An uncovered section of wall along Carrer de la Tapineria

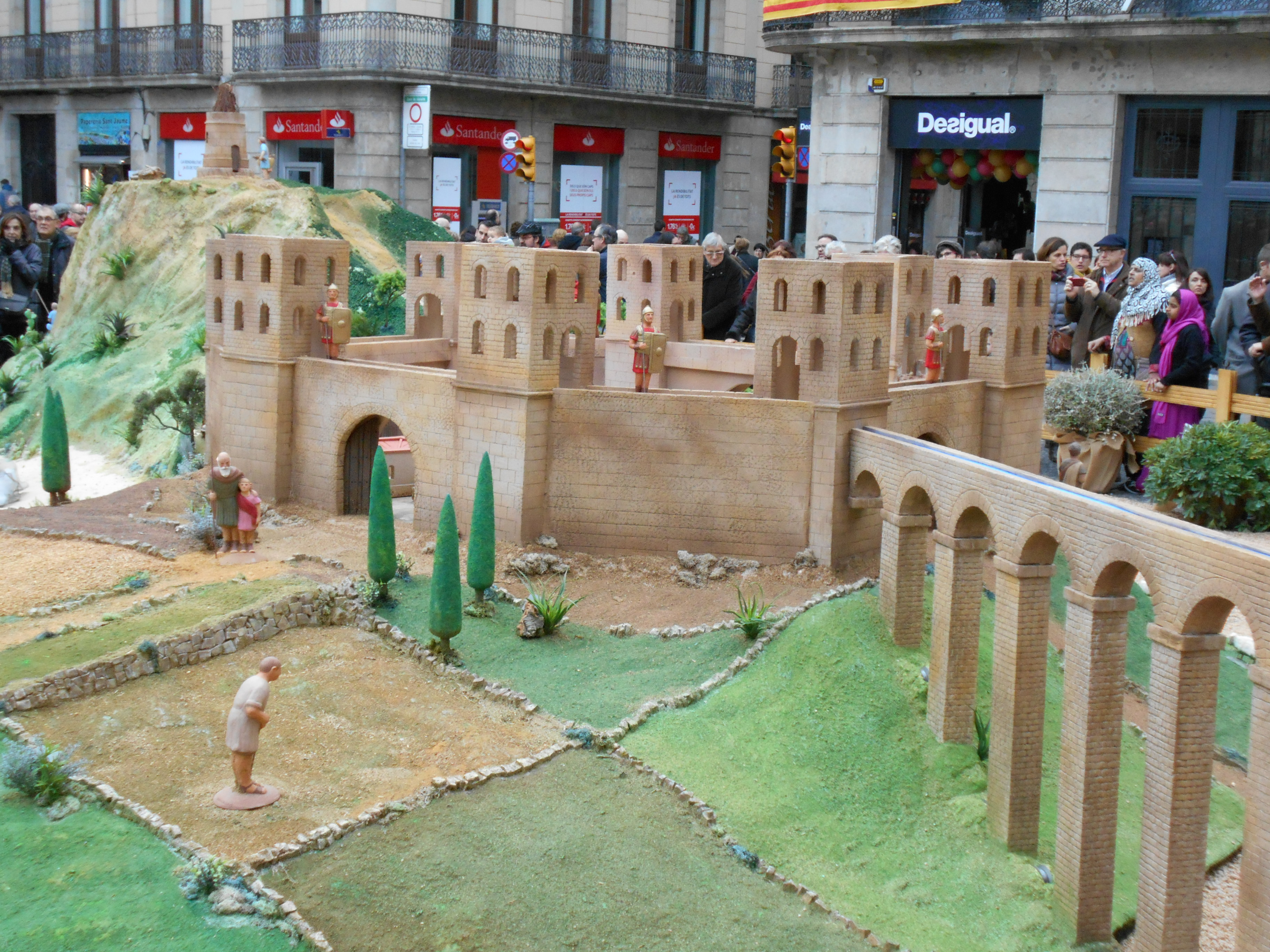
Representation of the walls of Barcino in a nativity scene located in the Plaça de Sant Jaume in 2014.

== See also ==
- Architecture of Barcelona
- History of Barcelona
- Museum of the History of Barcelona
- Urban planning of Barcelona

== Bibliography ==
- Art de Catalunya 3: Urbanisme, arquitectura civil i industrial [Art de Catalunya 3: Urban planning, civil and industrial architecture] (in Catalan). Barcelona: Edicions L'isard. 1998.
- Barral i Altet, Xavier; Beseran, Pere; Canalda, Sílvia; Guardià, Marta; Jornet, Núria (2000). Guia del Patrimoni Monumental i Artístic de Catalunya, vol. 1 [Guide to the Monumental and Artistic Heritage of Catalonia, vol. 1] (in Catalan). Barcelona: Pòrtic. ISBN 84-7306-947-1.
- Busquets, Joan (2004). Barcelona. La construcción urbanística de una ciudad compacta [Barcelona. The Urban Construction of a Compact City] (in Spanish). Barcelona: Serbal. ISBN 84-7628-458-6.
- Hernàndez i Cardona, Francesc Xavier (2001). Barcelona, Història d'una ciutat [Barcelona, History of a City] (in Catalan). Barcelona: Llibres de l'Índex. ISBN 84-95317-22-2.
- Roig, Josep L. (1995). Historia de Barcelona [History of Barcelona] (in Spanish). Barcelona: Primera Plana S.A. ISBN 84-8130-039-X.
