= Flemish Clock =

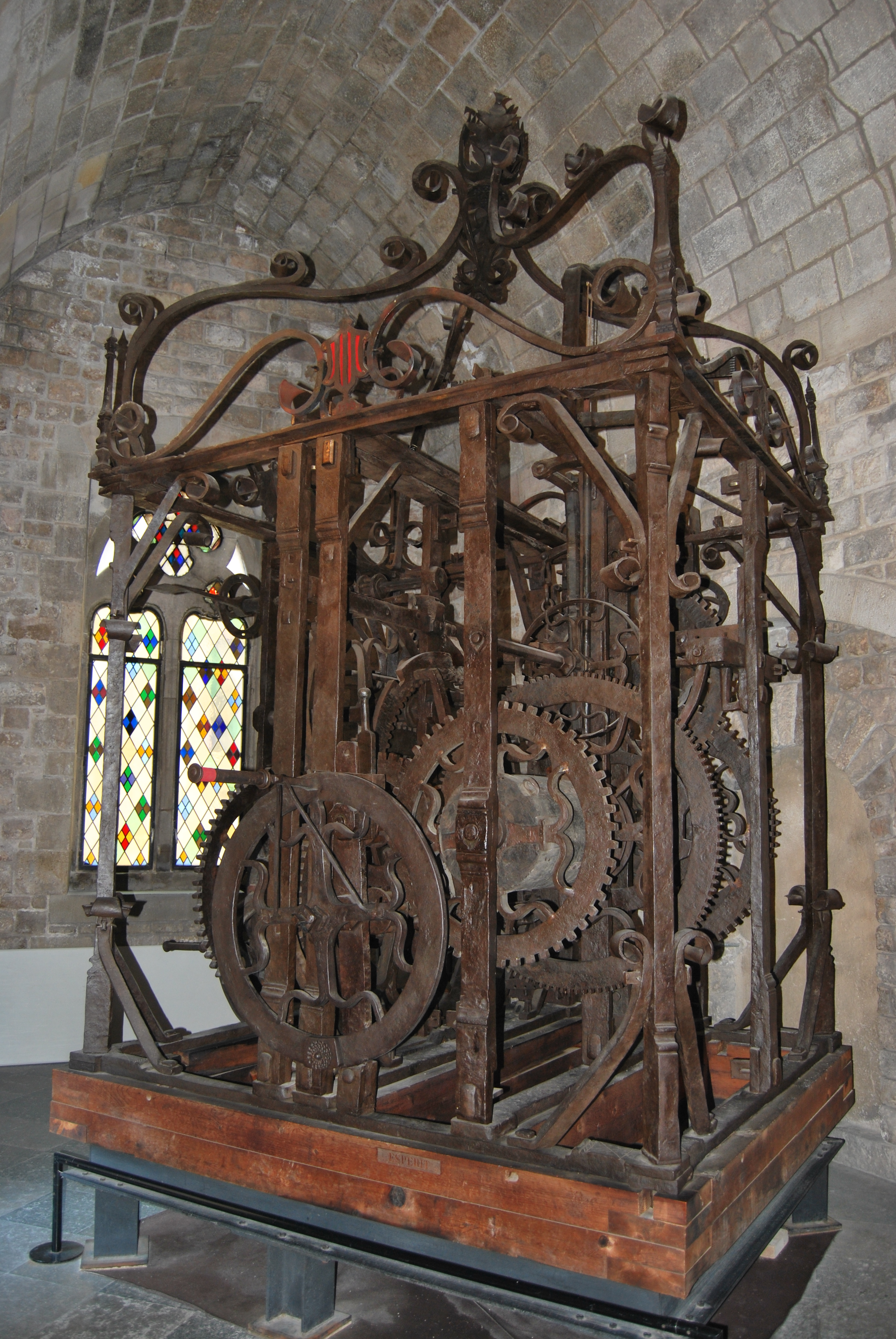
The Flemish Clock

The Flemish clock, or big clock of Barcelona, was the main clock of Barcelona for 287 years from 1577 to 1864. It was the 5th of the mechanical big clocks series that Barcelona had since 1396. In 1864 it was replaced by the 6th clock, a new one built by Albert Billeter, a Swiss watchmaker, because of the Hour's Local Service creation.

It is known as the Flemish clock because it was ordered in 1575 by the city counsellors from the Flemish watchmakers Simon Nicholau de Utrecht and Climent Osser of Purmerend.

The clock is dated 1576 and started its service on the top of the cathedral's tower bell in 1577, since when it has undergone several modifications. Eventually, in 1985 it was resited in the Barcelona City History Museum building, where it now remains.

== Sources ==
- Josep Bos i Bolós Senys, esquelles i cloquers. Les campanes de la catedral de Barcelona
- Ramon Jardí El rellotge dels flamencs de la Seu de Barcelona, dins Miscel·lània Fontseré. Barcelona: Gustavo Gili, 1961 p. 223-230
- Lluís Permanyer El mayor reloj del mundo. La Vanguardia 19 de gener de 1997
- Júlia Simón i Arias La farga catalana: estudi metal·lúrgic del procés. Barcelona: Institut d'Estudis Catalans, 1992.
- Jaume Xarrié, Eduard Farré El rellotge català. El Papiol: Efados, 2008
