= Barcelona City Hall =

Government building in Barcelona, Spain

Coordinates: 41.3822°N 2.1775°E

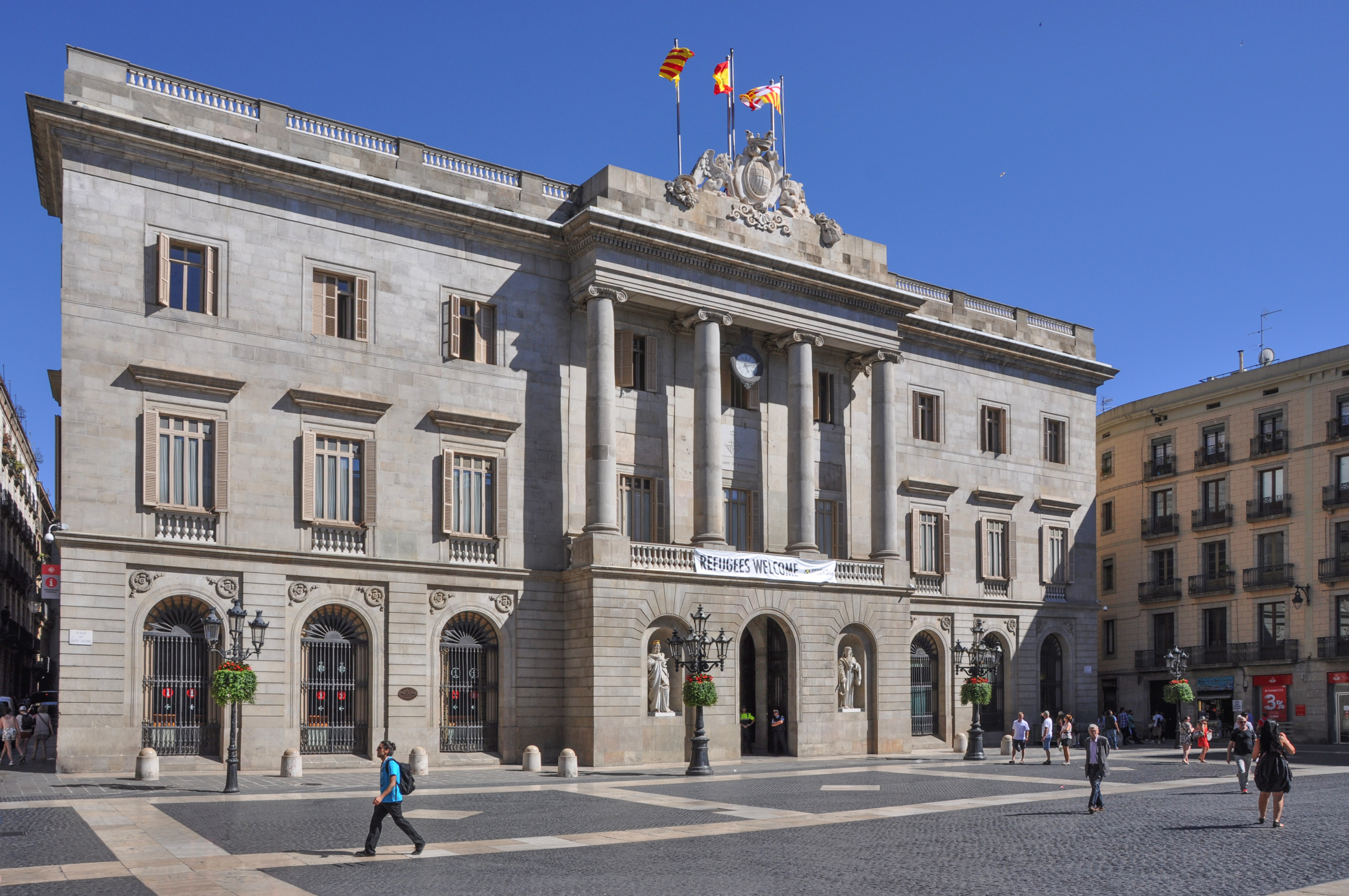
- 19th-century neoclassical facade
- Interactive map of the Barcelona City Hall area

General information
- Architectural style: Gothic, Neoclassical
- Location: Pl. de Sant Jaume, 1, 08002 Barcelona, Espagne
- Current tenants: Barcelona City Council
- Construction started: 1369
- Completed: 1402; 624 years ago
- Renovated: 1847
- Client: Consell de Cent
- Owner: City Council of Barcelona

Design and construction
- Architect: Arnau Bargués

Renovating team
- Architect: Josep Mas i Vila

Barcelona City Hall (Catalan: Casa de la Ciutat de Barcelona, Spanish: Casa de la Ciudad de Barcelona) is the seat of Barcelona City Council. It is situated in the Plaça Sant Jaume in the Gothic Quarter, opposite the Palau de la Generalitat de Catalunya housing the regional government.

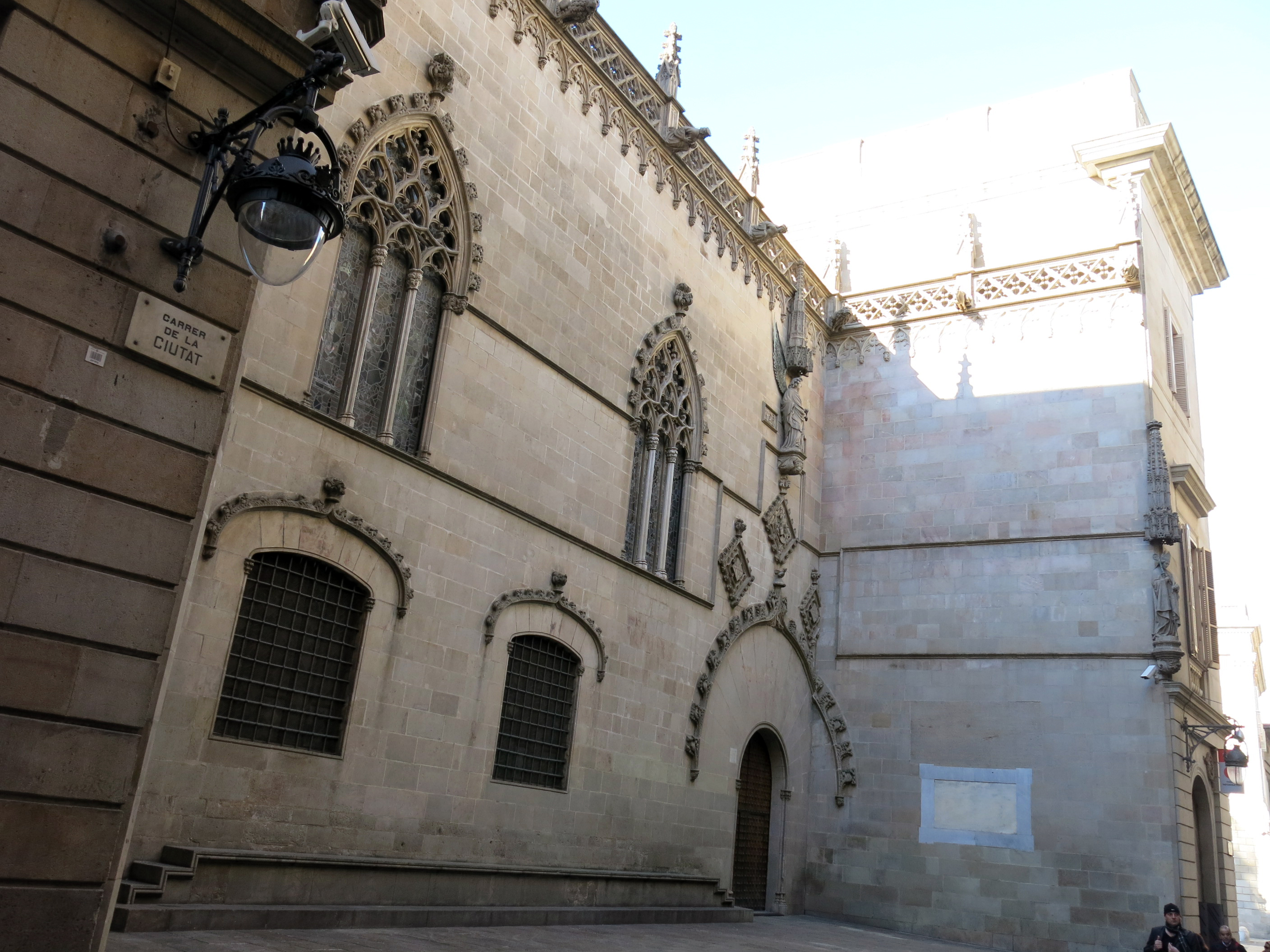
Medieval Gothic facade. Note the mutilation on the far right of the facade, caused by the addition of the neoclassical facade

The building maintains the Saló de Cent, where the Consell de Cent which governed the city met in the Middle Ages. The architect Arnau Bargués designed its Gothic facade, which was built between 1399 and 1402.

Josep Mas i Vila designed the current neoclassical facade, built between 1830 and 1847. When the church that is the namesake of the square was demolished in 1823, Mas was tasked with making a facade worthy of facing the Renaissance-era Generalitat building. The previous facade was to be sacrificed until a campaign by the Reial Acadèmia de Bones Lletres de Barcelona and the Reial Acadèmia Catalana de Belles Arts de Sant Jordi. The medieval door remains, with a notable mutilation.

In 2008, routine work on the city hall found Gothic and Renaissance paintings on the ceiling, underneath more modern paintings. In 2017, the council put €2.4 million towards the study and conservation of these paintings.
