= Museum of the History of Barcelona =

Coordinates: 41.3840°N 2.1775°E

- Museu d'Història de Barcelona (MUHBA)
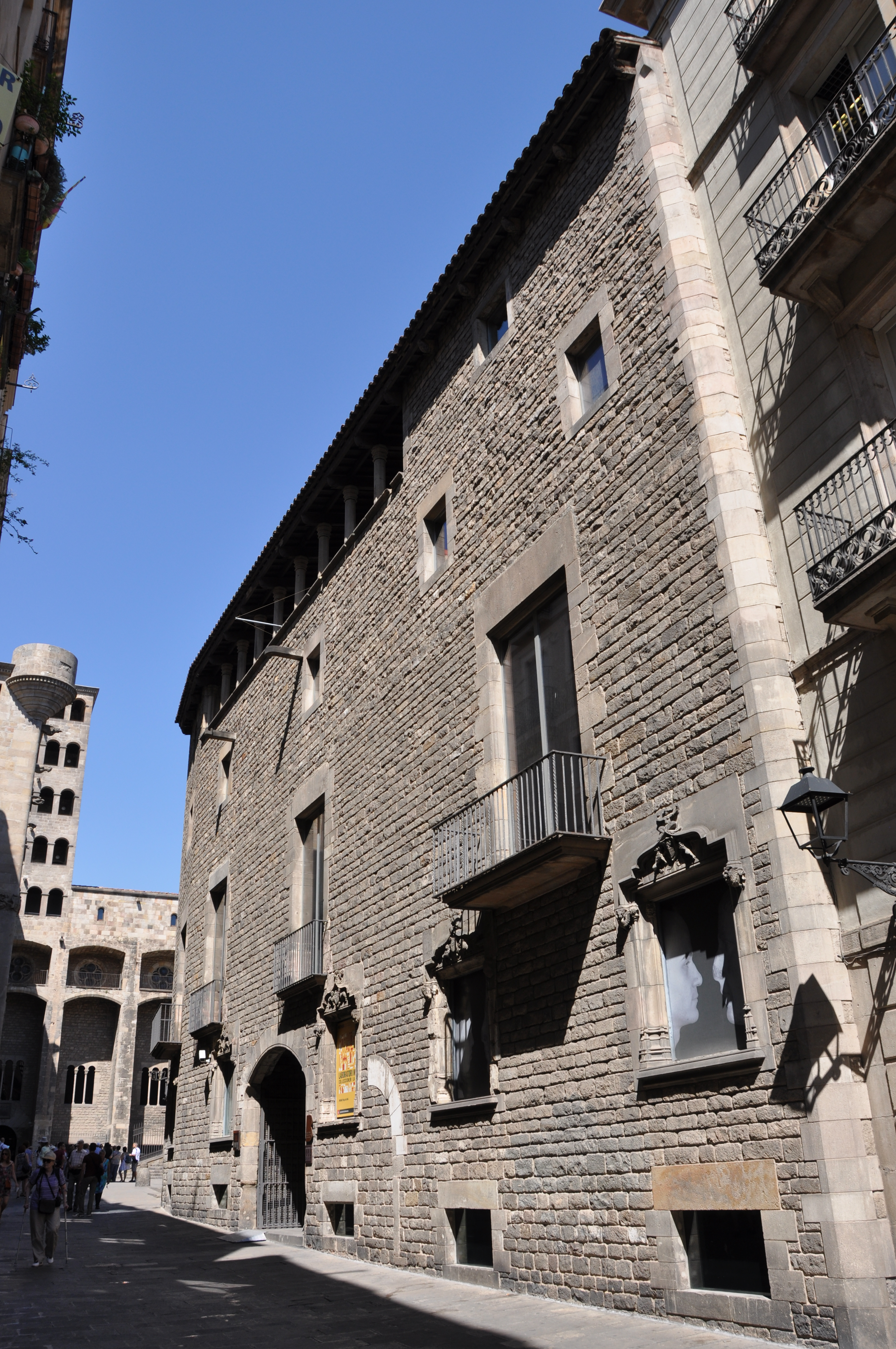
- Location: Casa Padellàs, Plaça del Rei, Barcelona (headquarters)
- Type: History museum
- Visitors: 816,989 (2018)
- Director: Joan Roca i Albert
- Owner: Barcelona City Council
- Public transit access: Jaume I 45, V15, V17
- Website: www.museuhistoria.bcn.cat

The Museum of the History of Barcelona (Catalan: Museu d'Història de Barcelona, MUHBA) is a history museum that conserves, researches, communicates and exhibits the historical heritage of the city of Barcelona, from its origins in Roman times until the present day. The museum's headquarters are located on Plaça del Rei, in the Barcelona Gothic Quarter (Barri Gòtic). It also manages several historic sites all around the city, most of them archaeological sites displaying remains of the ancient Roman city, called Barcino in Latin. Some others date to medieval times, including the Jewish quarter and the medieval royal palace called the Palau Reial Major. The rest are contemporary, among them old industrial buildings and sites related to Antoni Gaudí and the Spanish Civil War.

The museum was inaugurated on 14 April 1943; its principal promoter and first director was the historian Agustí Duran i Sanpere. It belongs to the City Council of Barcelona, as part of the Culture Institute.

== History ==
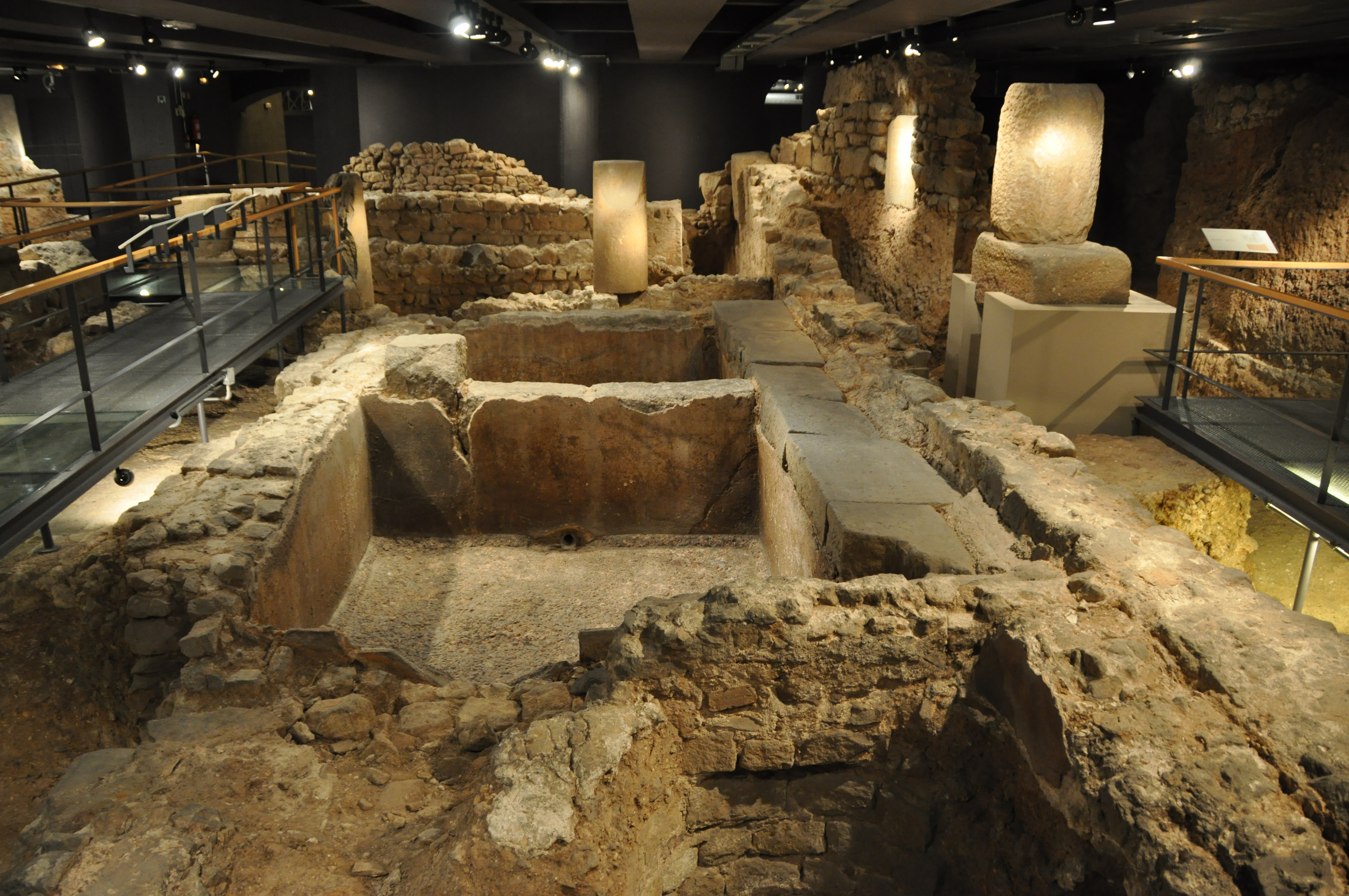
Remains of an ancient Roman salted fish and garum factory in the archaeological underground (MUHBA Plaça del Rei)

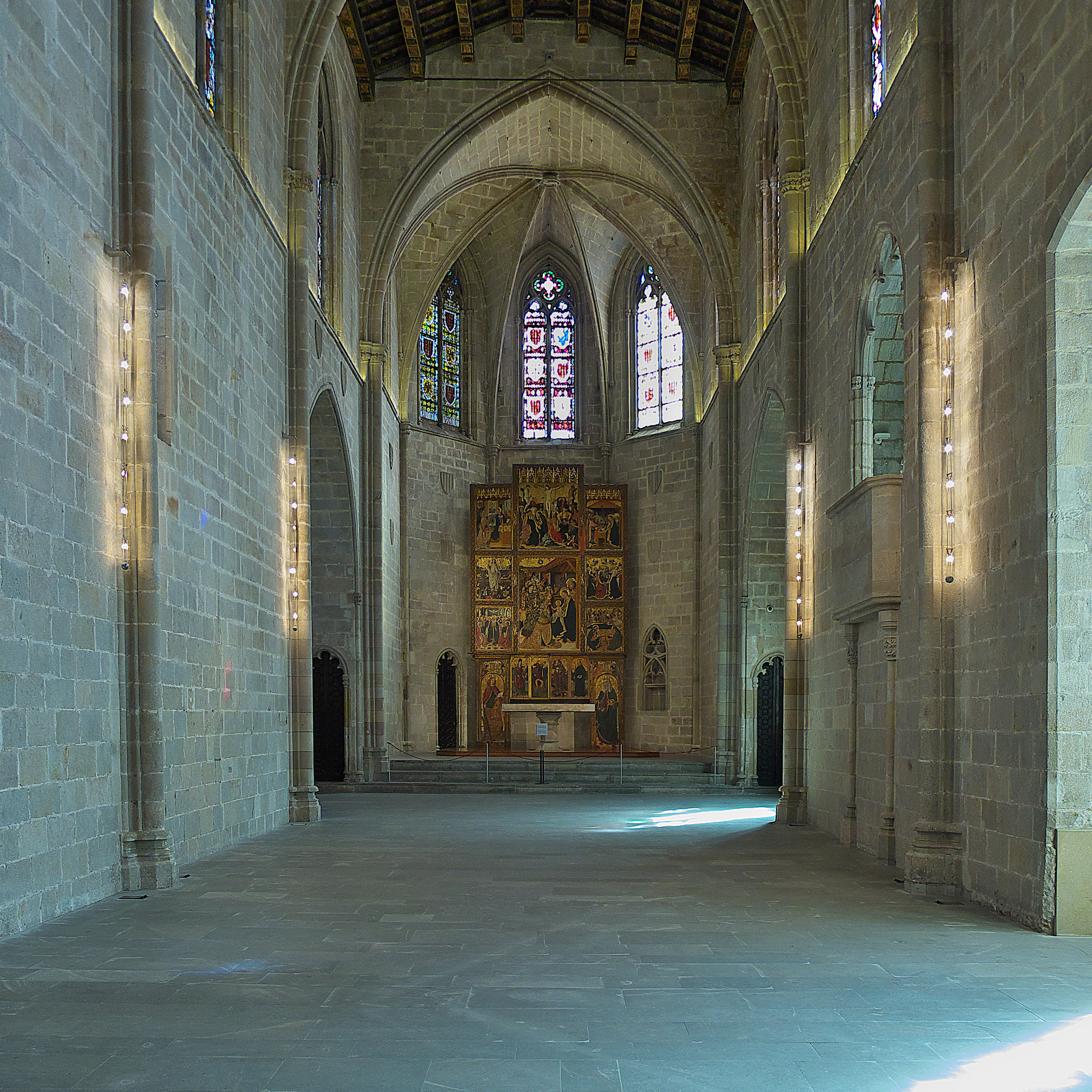
Saint Agatha chapel (14th century) with its gothic altarpiece (15th century), MUHBA Plaça del Rei

Beginning at the time of the 1888 Barcelona Universal Exposition there were several attempts and projects to create a museum about the history of Barcelona. MUHBA was the first of these actually to come to fruition.

In 1929, during the 1929 Barcelona International Exposition the municipality organized a temporary exhibition about Barcelona's past, present and future that constitutes the forerunner of MUHBA.

In 1931, Casa Padellàs, a late gothic palace (15th-16th centuries) was moved stone by stone from its original location on Mercaders street to Plaça del Rei, in order to preserve it and to avoid its demolition because of the opening of Via Laietana, an avenue that crosses through the old city to connect the new Barcelona Eixample with the port.

While rebuilding Casa Padellàs on its new location, some remains of the ancient city of Barcino (Latin name of Barcelona) were found. Immediately, archaeological research was undertaken in the surrounding area, exposing a whole quarter of the Roman city. The Spanish Civil War (1936–1939) put an end to this research, though the importance of the findings determined that this was the most fitting location for the historical museum planned since the 19th century, which would then become largely an archaeological museum.

The Museum of the History of Barcelona was finally inaugurated several years after the civil war, in 1943, under the Francoist regime. The core of the museum was then centered on the archaeological remains of the Roman and late antique city together with the medieval royal palace in Plaça del Rei (Palau Reial Major), which includes the main hall called Saló del Tinell (14th century) and the palatine chapel dedicated to Saint Agatha (14th century) with its 15th-century Gothic altarpiece, a work of the medieval painter Jaume Huguet. Several rooms of the rebuilt Casa Padellàs also exhibited objects bearing witness to the history of Barcelona along late medieval and modern times, up to the early 20th Century: the city government and its regulations, the guilds, civic celebrations, wars and conflicts, crafts and trade, the International Expositions held in Barcelona and the growth and transformation of the city in the industrial era, among other topics.

The museum gradually incorporated new sites such as the Temple of Augustus and the Roman sepulchral way in Vila de Madrid square (found in 1954). The archaeological zone at the Plaça del Rei also grew, with new discoveries such as the Early Christian baptistery (1968).

After Franco died in late 1975 and democracy was restored in Spain, and particularly since 1979, the role of the museum was reconsidered. The permanent static exhibition about the history of Barcelona in the rooms of Casa Padellàs was closed around 1990. Since 1996 Casa Padellàs's rooms serve for temporary exhibitions that allow more dynamic overviews and crossed discussions about key subjects of Barcelona's history. Simultaneously, the archaeological area was completely remodeled and its museoumography updated, incorporating recent knowledge about the city in Roman and late antique times; the remodeled exhibit opened in 1998.

In recent decades, MUHBA has put more focus on contemporary history while simultaneously growing as a network of heritage sites, tending to provide through them a more complete coverage over the History of Barcelona.

Since 2005 MUHBA has published the scientific magazine Quarhis (Quaderns d'Arqueologia i Història de la ciutat de Barcelona) as an updated successor to the former magazine Cuadernos de Arqueología e Historia de la Ciudad (1960–1980)

MUHBA impulses a European network of city history museums and research centers on urban history (since 2010).

== Museum sites ==
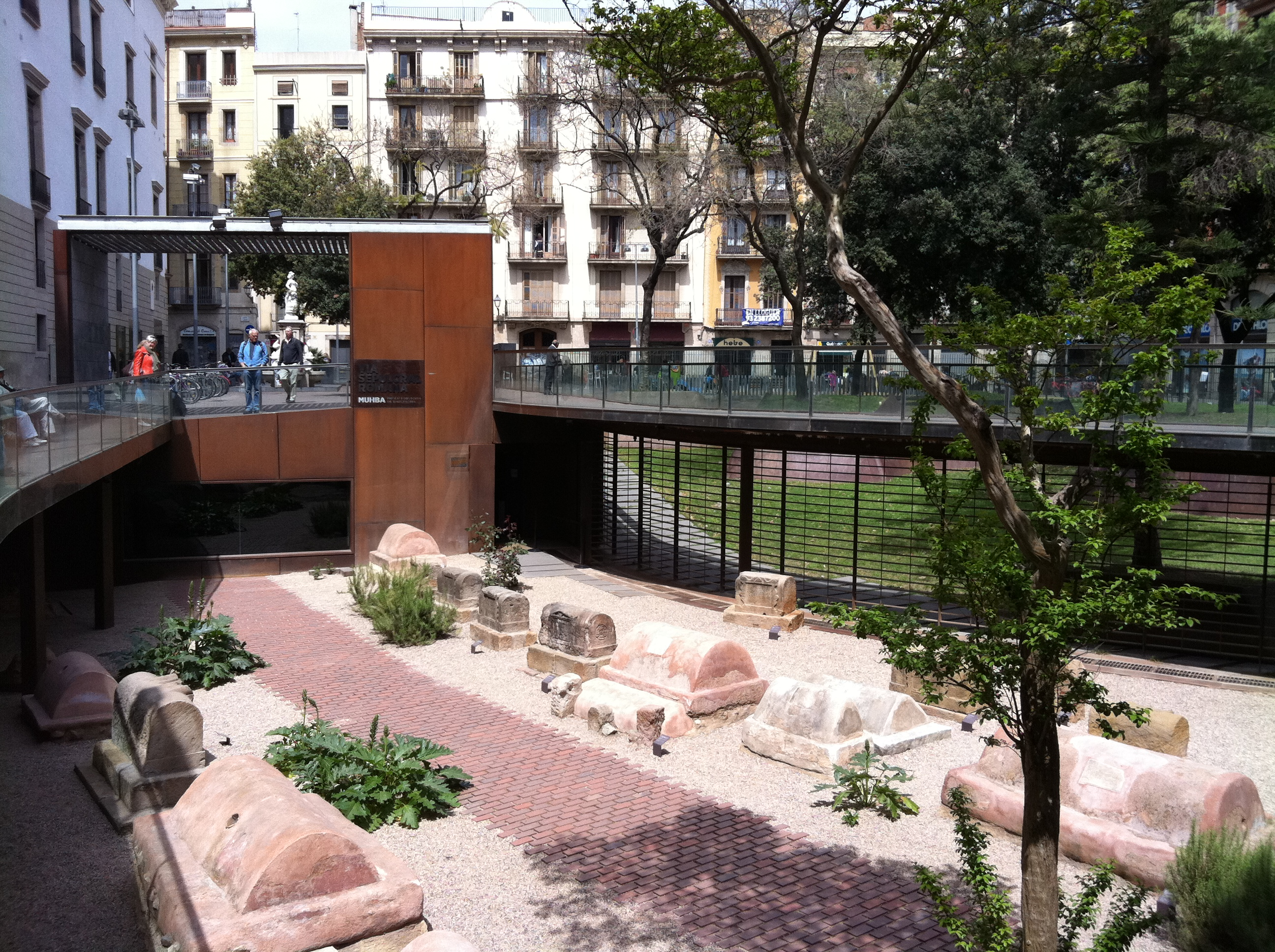
Roman sepulchral way in Vila de Madrid square

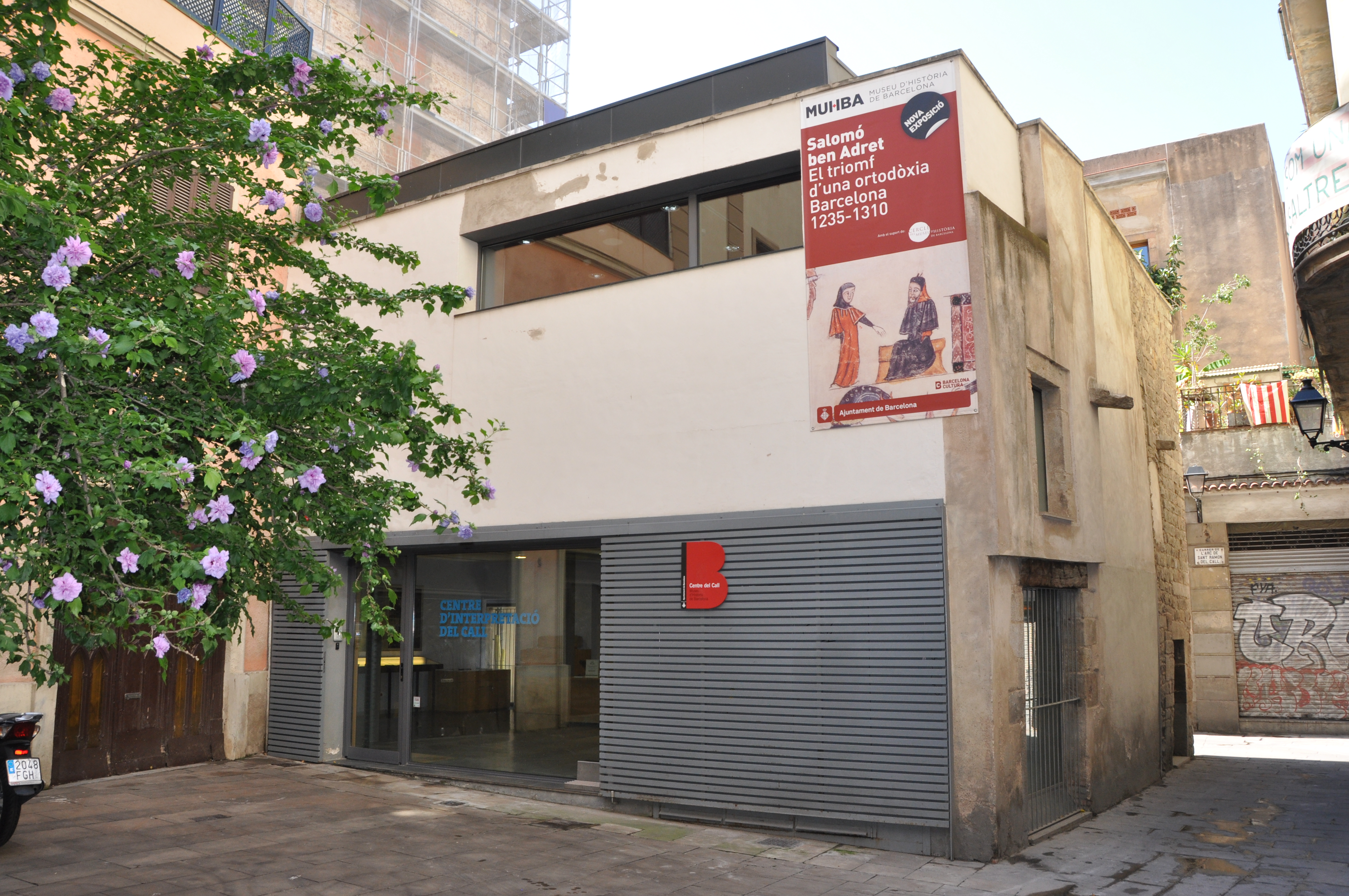
MUHBA El Call (Jewish quarter)

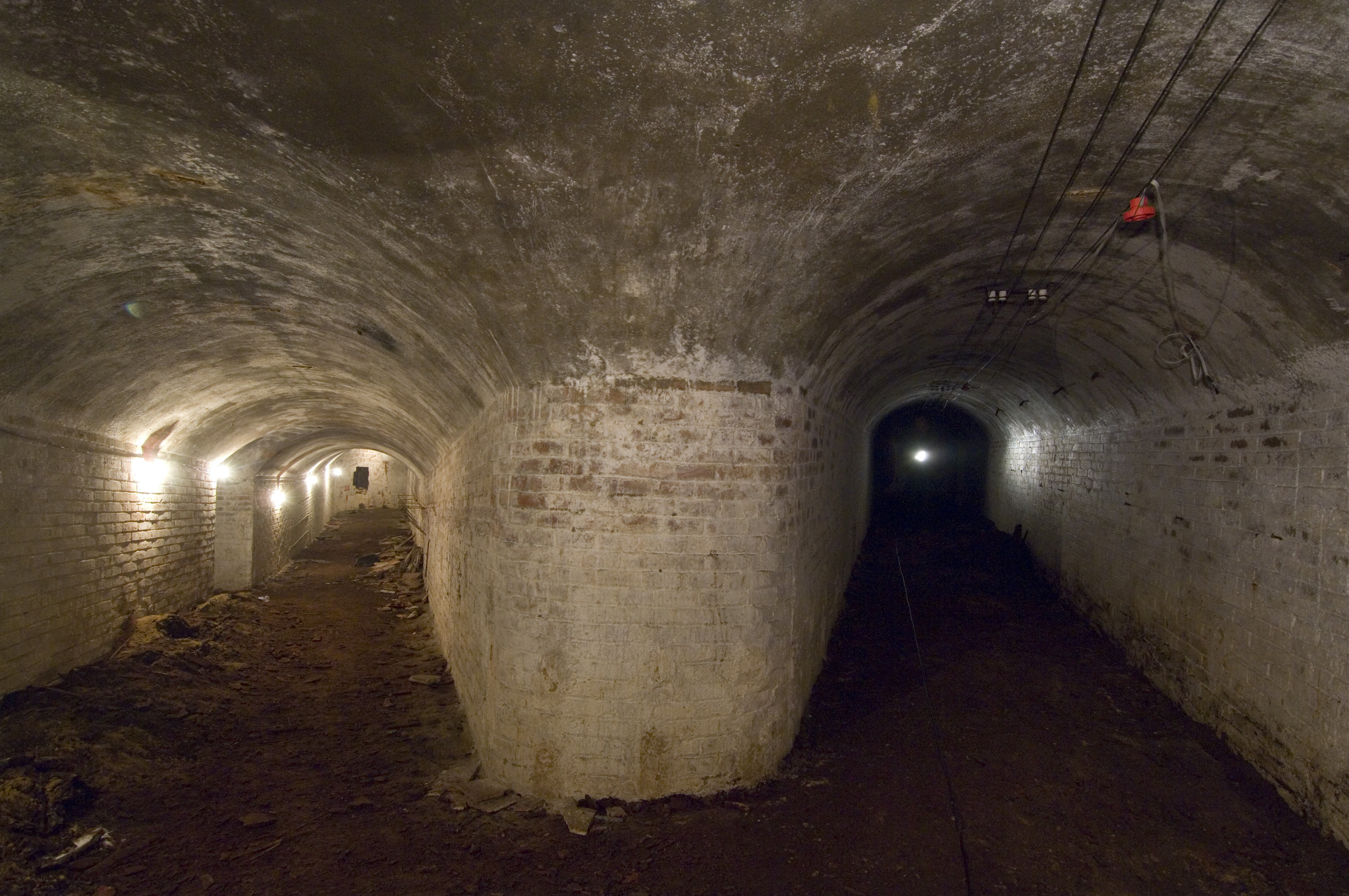
Air-raid shelter 307, built during the Spanish Civil War

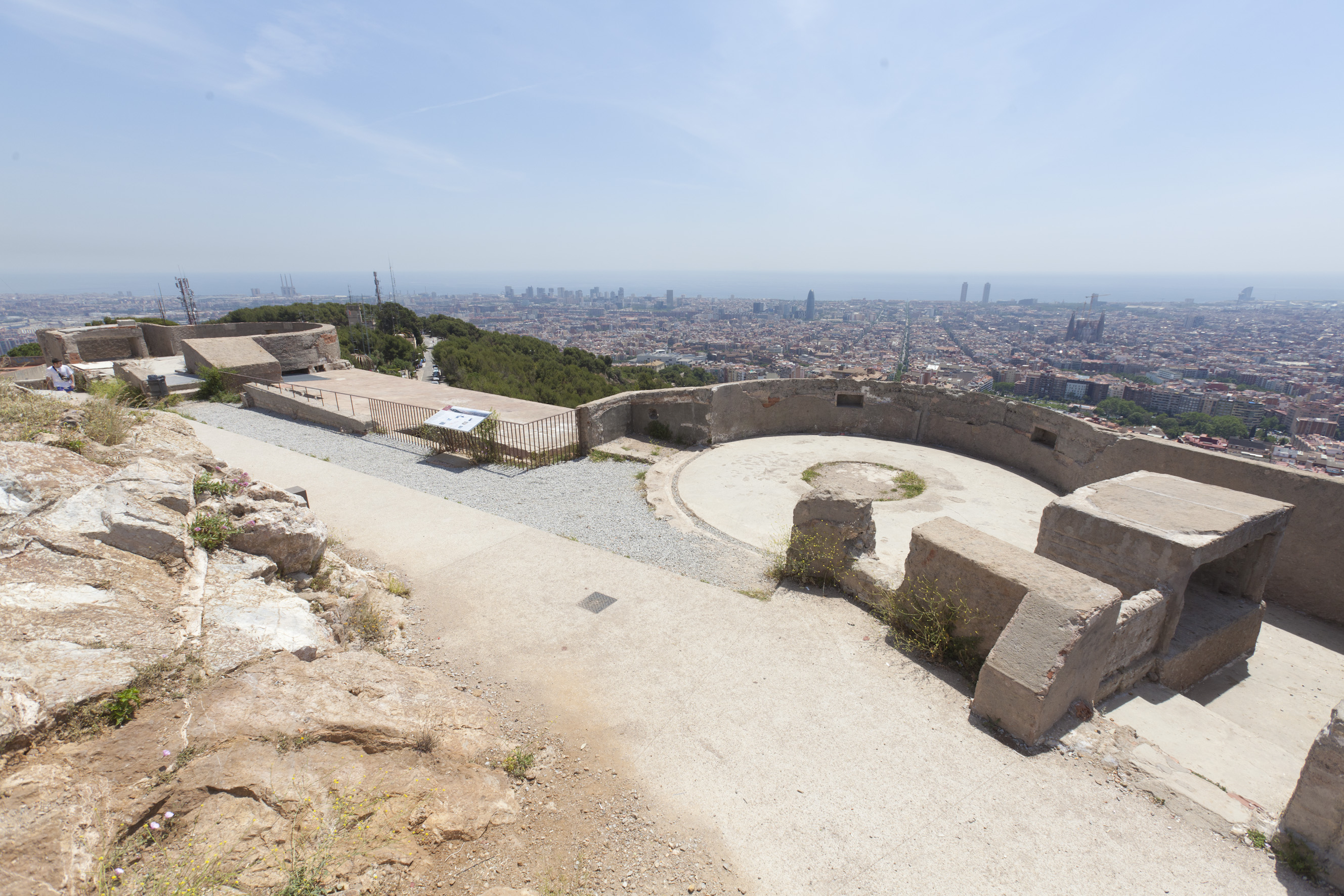
Turó de la Rovira. Settlements of antiaircraft batteries.

The Museum of the History of Barcelona has several heritage sites spread all around the city. Most of them are archaeological sites displaying remains of the ancient Roman city, called Barcino. Others refer to medieval times and the rest cover the contemporary city, including old industrial buildings and sites related to Gaudí and the Spanish Civil War.

- MUHBA Plaça del Rei. Located in the Gothic Quarter, Ciutat Vella district. Headquarters of the Museum. The entrance through Padellàs House courtyard is one of the best examples of Catalán gothic courtyards in private houses (built in the 15th and 16th centuries, reconstructed 1931). Visit the remains of a whole quarter of the ancient Roman city of Barcino in the archaeological underground. The archaeological area underneath Plaça del Rei covers over 4000 m^{2}. There is an exhibition about daily life in Roman houses and a walk over factories (laundry, dying, salted fish and garum, winery) shops (tabernae) walls (intervallum, inner parts of the towers) and streets (cardo minor). The remains of the early Christian and visigothic Episcopal architectural complex (cross shaped church, bishop's palace, baptistery) can also be found. A small exhibition outlines the medieval history of Barcelona below the romanesque vaults of the medieval Royal Palace. The two main architectural pieces are the large ceremonial hall called Saló del Tinell covered with large round arches (14th century), and the palatine chapel of Saint Agatha (14th century) with its original altarpiece, a 15th-century work by the Catalán painter Jaume Huguet. Salo del Tinell often houses temporary exhibitions.
- MUHBA Temple of Augustus Located in the Gothic Quarter, Ciutat Vella district stand four large columns of the Roman temple of Barcino, dedicated to Emperor Augustus. Free access during opening hours.
- MUHBA Roman sepulchral way in Vila de Madrid square, within the Gothic Quarter, Ciutat Vella district. Partly visible in open air, this was a burial area located along one of the roads leading to the Roman city. There is also an exhibition about Roman funeral traditions, where objects found in the graves are displayed.
- MUHBA Maritime gate of the Roman walls In the Gothic Quarter Ciutat Vella district. Remains of the thermal baths area built behind the maritime gate of the Roman walls and a portion of these.
- MUHBA Roman Domus of Saint Honorat. In the Gothic Quarter, Ciutat Vella district. Foundations of a Roman 4th-century private house decorated with polychrome mosaics and wall paintings together with large medieval tanks for grain storage
- MUHBA Roman Domus of Avinyó. In the Gothic Quarter, Ciutat Vella district. Remains of an ancient Roman domus decorated with wall paintings
- MUHBA El Call (Jewish quarter). In the Gothic Quarter, Ciutat Vella district, is the very center of the old Jewish quarter, called "El Call", a reference to the small passageways. Here can be seen and found historical information about El Call, the Jewish Barcelona community and the community's cultural legacy.
- MUHBA Santa Caterina In Ciutat Vella district. Within Santa Caterina market, which stands over a demolished medieval monastery whose foundations are partially visible. Information about human settlements in this part of the city since prehistoric times is provided. Free access during open hours.
- MUHBA Vil·la Joana: an old farm house placed in Vallvidrera, within Collserola natural park, in the outskirts of the city. In the 19th century, it became a residential villa where the prominent Catalán poet Jacint Verdaguer died in 1902. The exhibition puts Verdaguer and his literary work on the crossroad of literature, nature and the city.
- MUHBA Park Güell-House of the guard. In La Salut neighborhood, Gràcia district. One of the pavilions flanking the main entrance to the Park. An architectural work of Gaudí that houses an exhibition focused on the house itself, the park and the city, and that at the same time allows a direct and close knowledge of Gaudi's architectural concept for interiors.
- MUHBA Oliva Artés Formerly a factory, witnessing the industrial past of the district where it stands (El Poblenou). Currently houses an exhibition focused on contemporary Barcelona, from the 19th-century industrialization up to 21st century. Ten key subjects summarize the evolution of the city, from a small town encircled by its walls to the contemporary metropolis.
- MUHBA at Fabra i Coats. Fabra & Coats was one of the most important textile companies in Spain. Its large 19th-century factory buildings in Sant Andreu district have been largely preserved. They currently house many public services and facilities. MUHBA is the responsible of the boiler room. An informational and display centre focusing on work and the city is planned.
- Water pumping station (MUHBA Casa de l'aigua) In Trinitat Vella neighborhood, Sant Andreu district. Built in 1915–1919, when the Barcelona public water supply system was entirely refurbished. Houses the permanent exhibition "Water revolution in Barcelona. Running water and the modern city".
- MUHBA Air-raid shelter 307 (Refugi 307) In El Poble-sec neighborhood, Sants-Montjuïc district. One of the best preserved air-raid shelters built during Spanish Civil War in order to protect the population against the severe bombing of Barcelona in 1937 and 1938. More than 200 m. of tunnels.
- MUHBA Turó de la Rovira. In Can Baró neighborhood, Horta-Guinardó district. At the top of one of the hills that raise over Barcelona flatland. 360° panoramic view over the city. Settlements of anti aircraft batteries that defended Barcelona against bombing during Spanish Civil War. Traces of the shantytown which survived from after war until 1990. As of May 2, 2023, Barcelona City Council has closed access to the Turó de la Rovira site between 1930 and 0900 hours in the summer, and 1730 and 0900 hours in the winter, due to concerns regarding noise pollution and antisocial behaviour. The site was, until then, a popular site for social gatherings at night-time, due to the peaceful location and panoramic view of the city.
- Outstanding Catalan Persons Gallery (Galeria de Catalans Il·lustres). A portrait gallery of 47 outstanding Catalans of the 19th and 20th centuries exhibited in Palau Requesens (Reial Acadèmia de Bones Lletres)

== See also ==
- Flemish Clock - one of the exhibits

== Bibliography ==
- Julia Beltran de Heredia: The archaeological remains of Plaça del Rei in Barcelona: From Barcino to Barcinona (1st to 7th centuries). Museu d’Història, Barcelona 2002. ISBN 84-932113-4-6.
