= Plaça Sant Jaume =

Square in Barcelona, Spain

Coordinates: 41°22′57″N 02°10′37″E

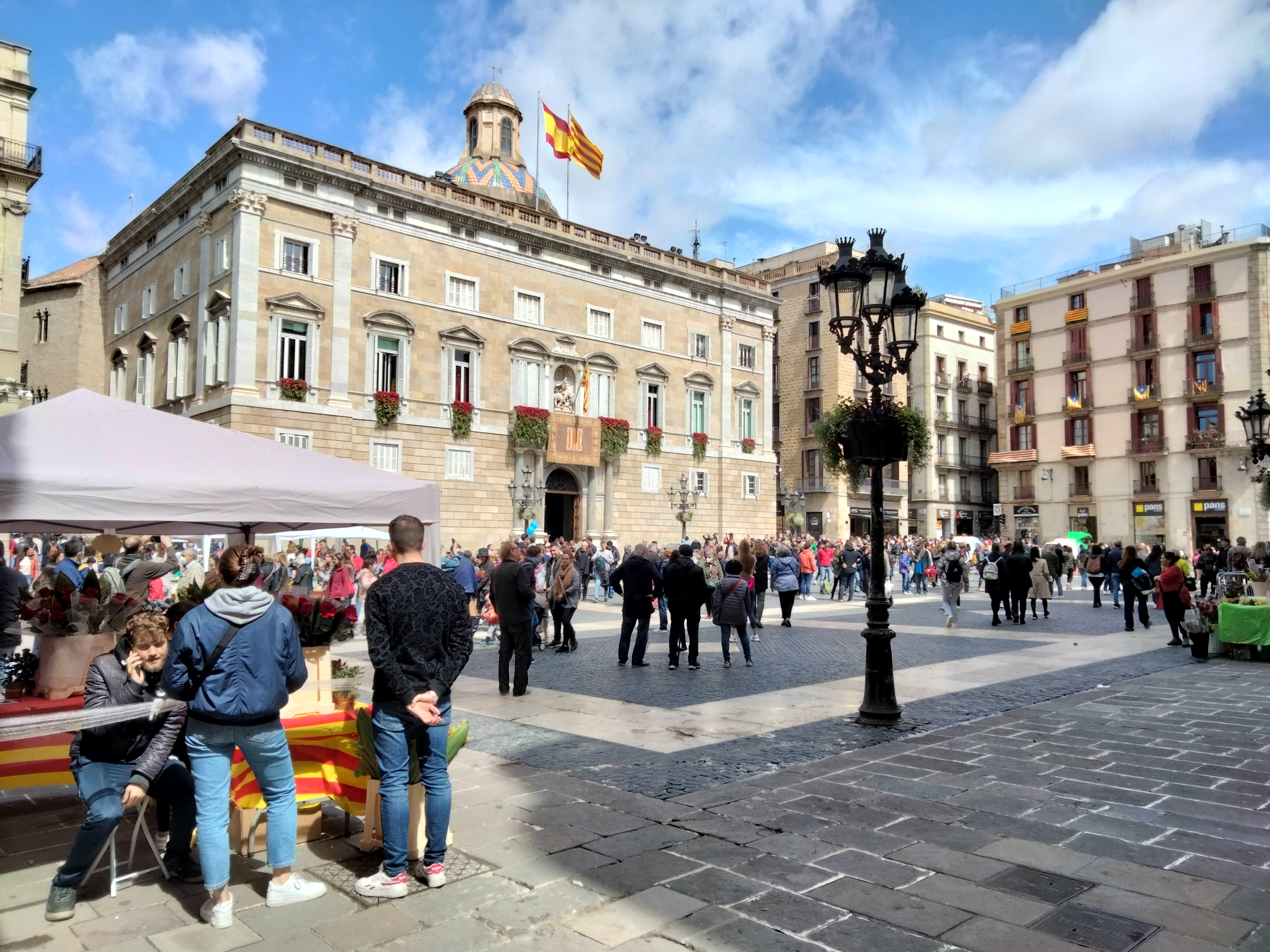
Saint George's Day at Plaça Sant Jaume in front of the Palace of the Generalitat

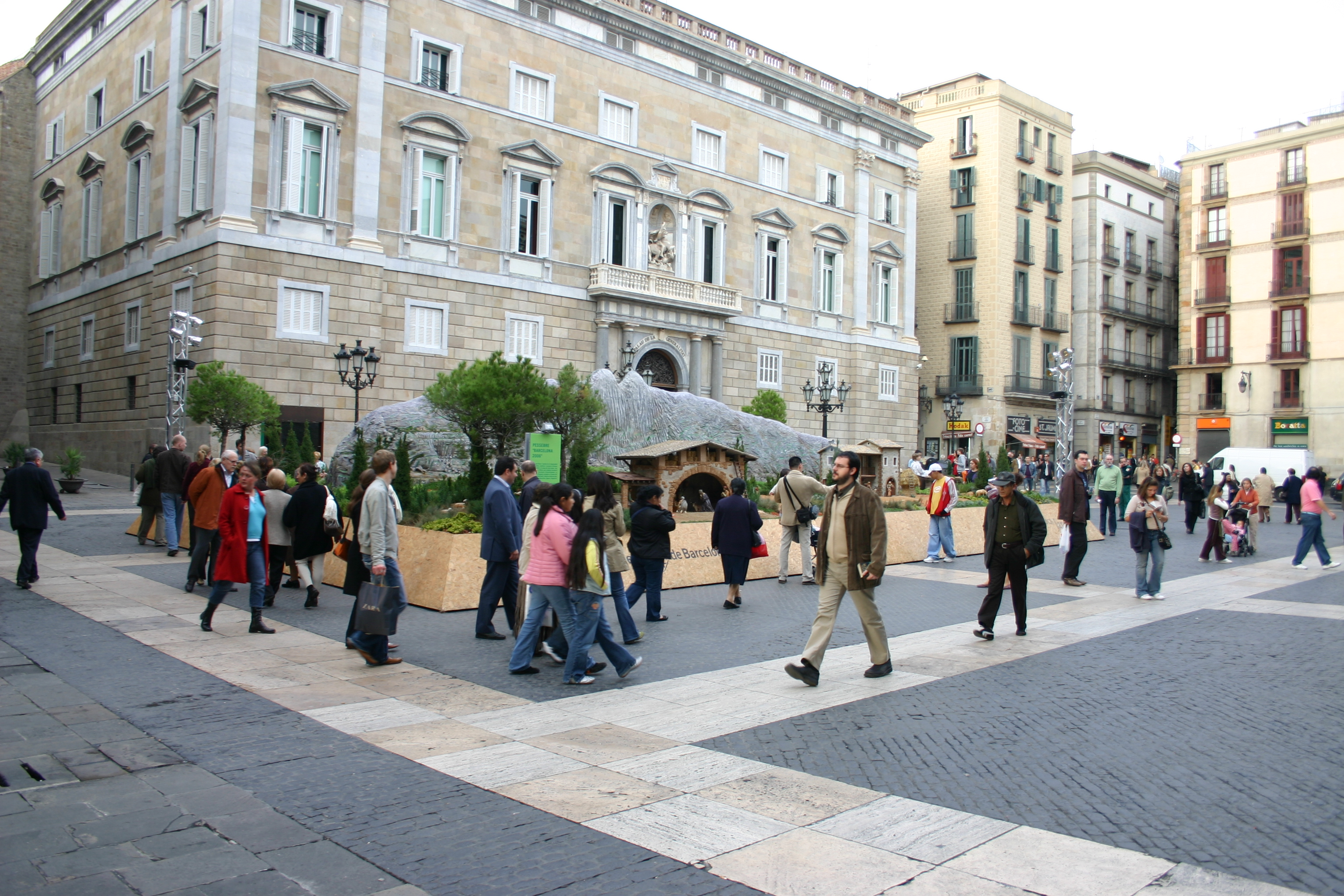
Nativity scene at Plaça Sant Jaume

The Plaça de Sant Jaume (Catalan pronunciation: [ˈplasə ˈsaɲ ˈʒawmə], in English "Saint James's Square") is a square at the center of the Old City of Barcelona and the administrative heart of both the city and surrounding Catalonia. This is because the Palace of the Generalitat of Catalonia and the City Hall are located here across from one another.

This square's origin stems from the early-19th century, when the new main façade of City Hall was built and the former church of Sant Jaume was demolished.

== History ==
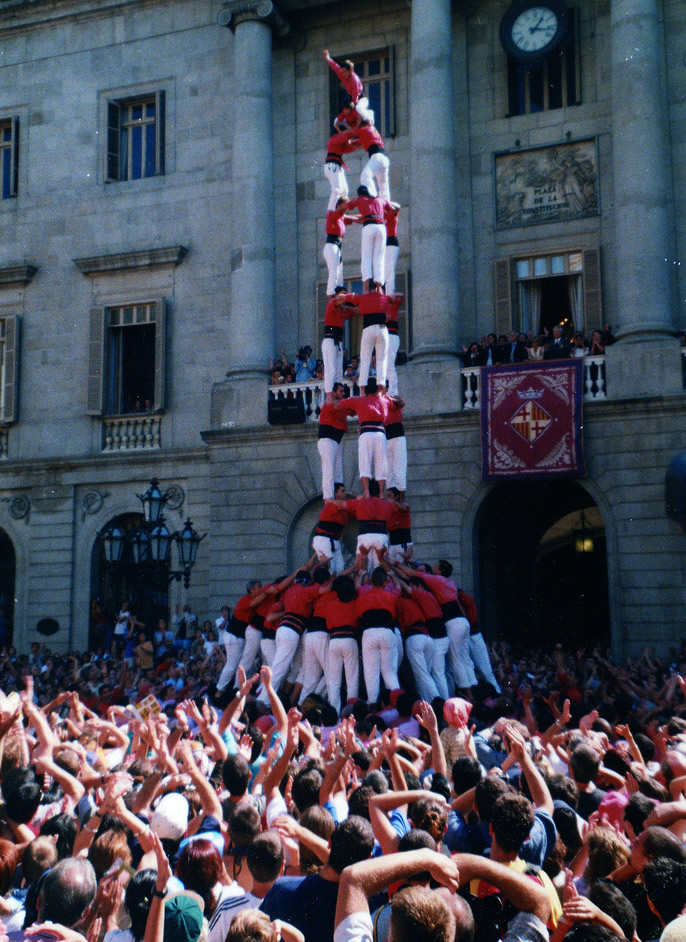
The Castellers de Barcelona in front of the City Hall

The Plaça Sant Jaume is located at the former center of the Roman city of Barcino, where its main streets, the cardo (modern day Llibreteria and Call streets) and decumanus (now the streets of Bisbe/Ciutat/Regomir), crossed. At this junction there was the forum and the Temple of Augustus, of which four columns are preserved on top of Mont Tàber, found at the adjacent Paradís Street.

The square takes its modern name from the church of Sant Jaume, which had been located at the site of the square since medieval times. Formerly, the city council of Barcelona met in the porch at the front of that church, until it bought a number of nearby homes that would house the future headquarters of the institution on the neighboring street. The old church was demolished in 1823 when Ferran Street was being built; its demolition also allowed for the square to be rebuilt as it exists today. Prior to these demolitions, the square was limited to a small angular space, with the rest of the future plaza being occupied by the same church, its cemetery, and the houses of the Magistracy and the General Court of the Veguer.

The Plaça Sant Jaume has also been called "Constitution Square" in various historical periods, and this name appeared on a plaque on the façade of the City Hall (removed in 2013).

== See also ==
- Street names in Barcelona
- Urban planning of Barcelona
