= Joseph Oriol =

Spanish saint

Saint Joseph Oriol
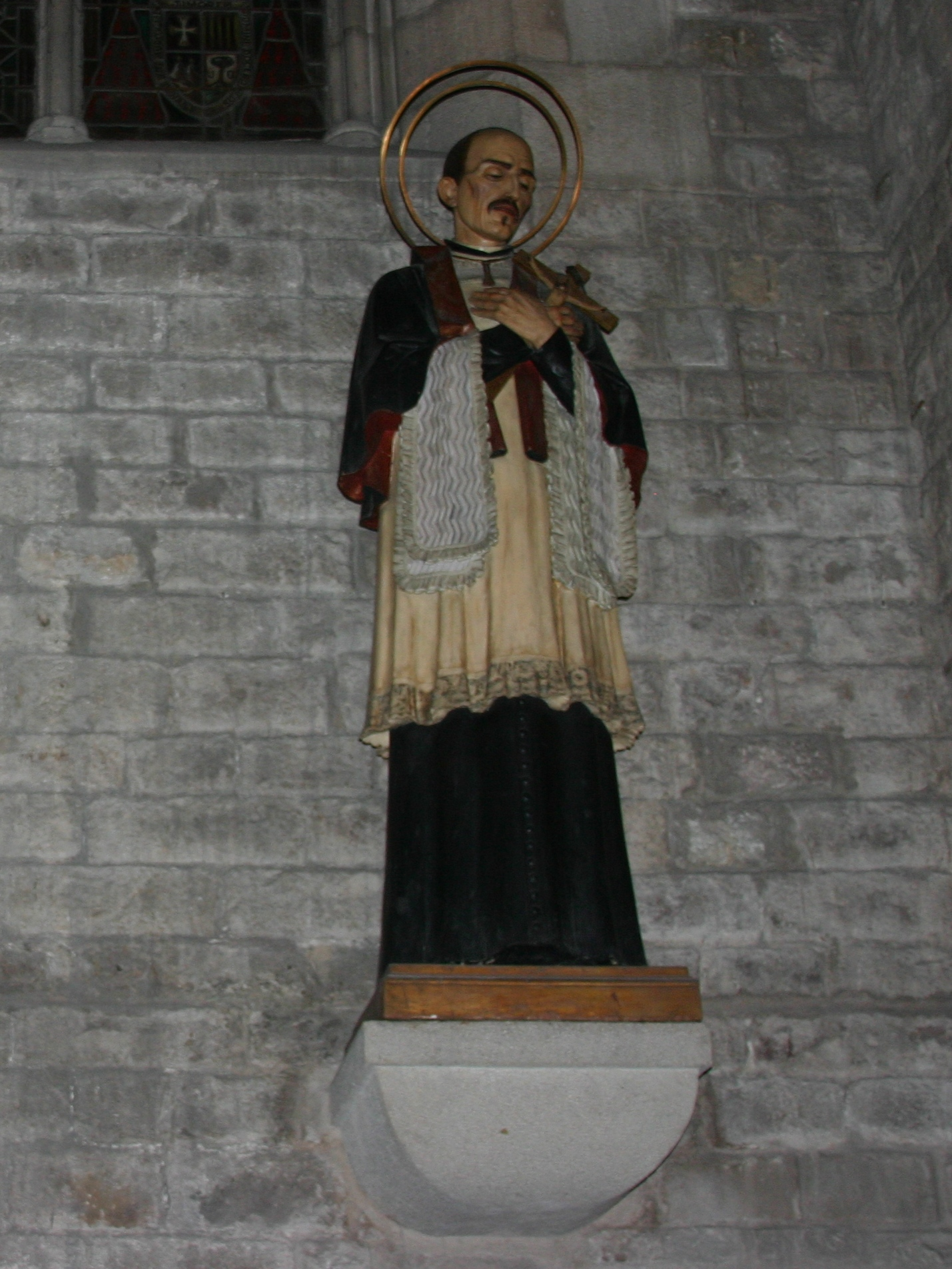
- Statue at the Basilica de Santa Maria del Mar.

Priest
- Born: 23 November 1650; Barcelona, Crown of Aragon
- Died: 23 March 1702 (aged 51); Barcelona, Crown of Aragon
- Venerated in: Catholic Church
- Beatified: 5 September 1806, Saint Peter's Basilica, Papal States by Pope Pius VII
- Canonized: 20 May 1909, Saint Peter's Basilica, Kingdom of Italy by Pope Pius X
- Major shrine: Santa Maria del Pi, Spain
- Feast: 23 March
- Attributes: Priest's cassock

Joseph Oriol (Catalan: Josep Oriol; Latin: Iosephus Oriol Barcelonensis) (23 November 1650 – 23 March 1702) was a Spanish Roman Catholic priest, and venerated as a saint in the Catholic Church. He was called the "Thaumaturgus of Barcelona".

He was beatified under Pope Pius VII on 5 September 1808, and Pope Pius X later canonized him as a saint on 20 May 1909.

== Life ==
Joseph Oriol was born on 23 November 1650, he studied at the University of Barcelona, and received his doctorate in theological studies on 1 August 1674.

He was ordained as a priest on 30 May 1676. He visited Rome in 1686, and was granted a benefice in the church of Santa Maria del Pi in Barcelona, at the behest of Pope Innocent XI. Wanting to experience martyrdom, he went to Rome in April 1698 to offer himself for the foreign missions, but he fell sick at Marseille and returned to Barcelona. He was said to have prophetic and miraculous powers; the dying, the blind, the deaf and dumb, the lame, and the paralytic, were said to be instantly cured by him.

He was buried in the Santa Maria del Pi Church in Barcelona.

== Veneration ==
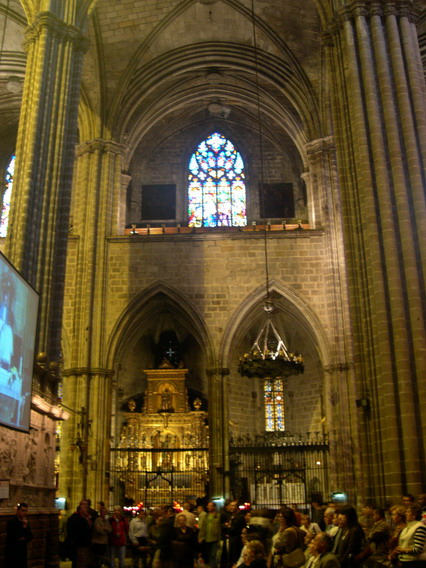
Saint Joseph Oriol Chapel and the Saint Pancras and Saint Roch Chapels in the cathedral of Barcelona

He was beatified by Pius VII, 5 September 1806, and canonized by Pius X, 20 May 1909. His feast occurs on 23 March.

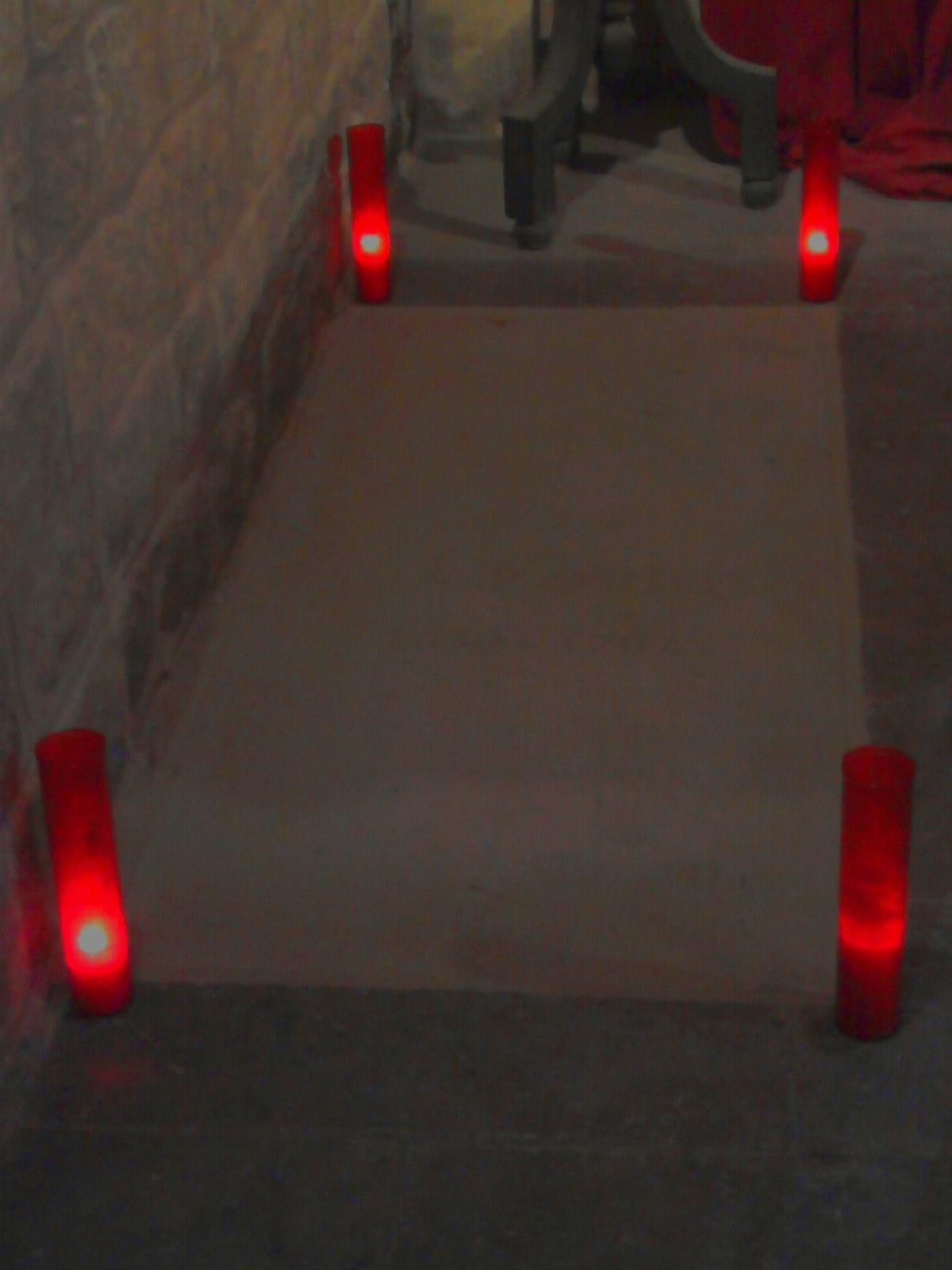
San Joseps Grave at Santa Maria del Pi Church Barcelona
