= Plaça del Pi =

Square in Barcelona, Spain

Coordinates: 41.3824°N 2.1737°E

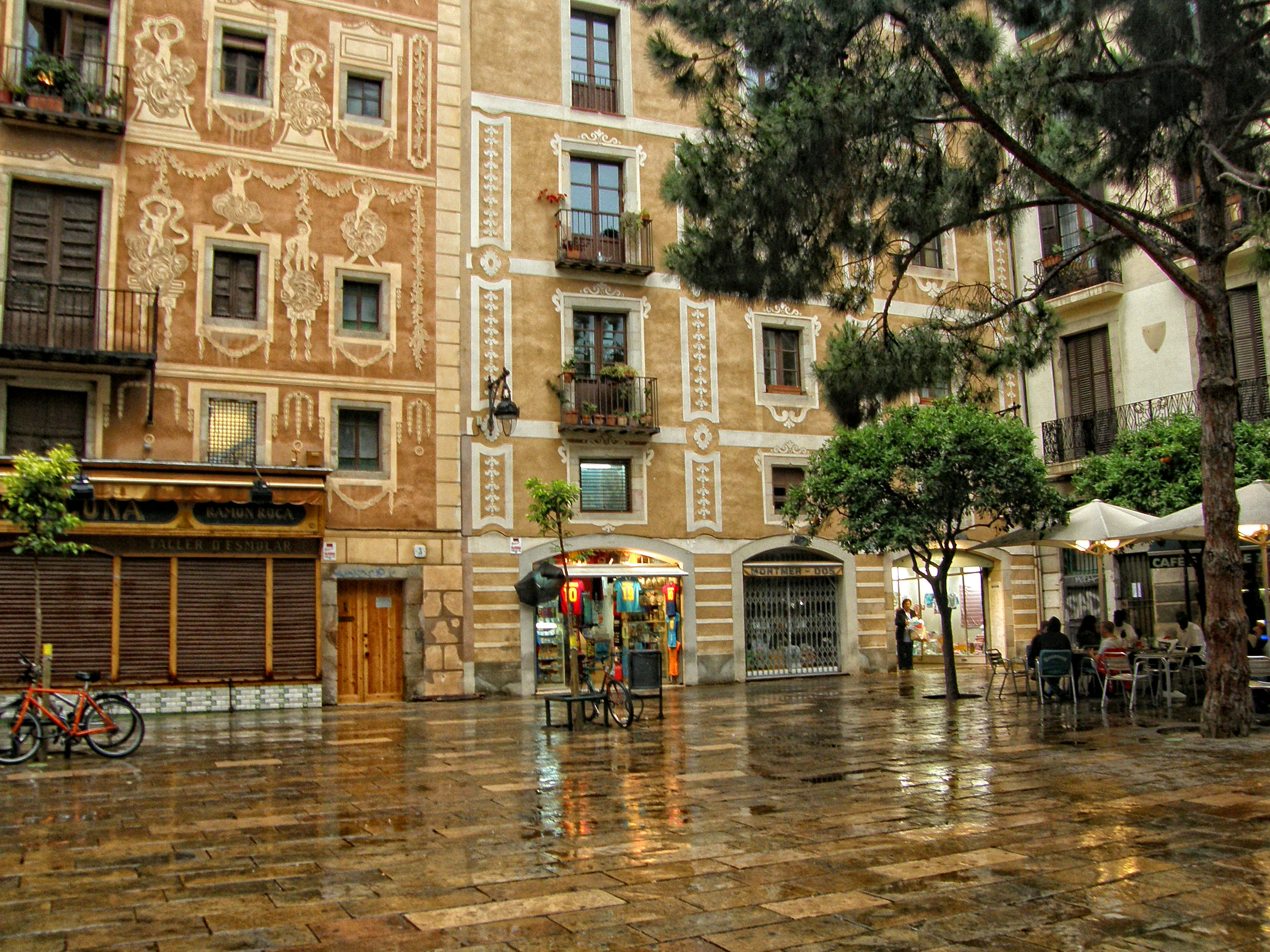
- Alternative names: Plaza del Pino

General information
- Type: Town square
- Location: Gothic Quarter
- Town or city: Barcelona
- Country: Spain
- Named for: Basilica of Santa Maria del Pi

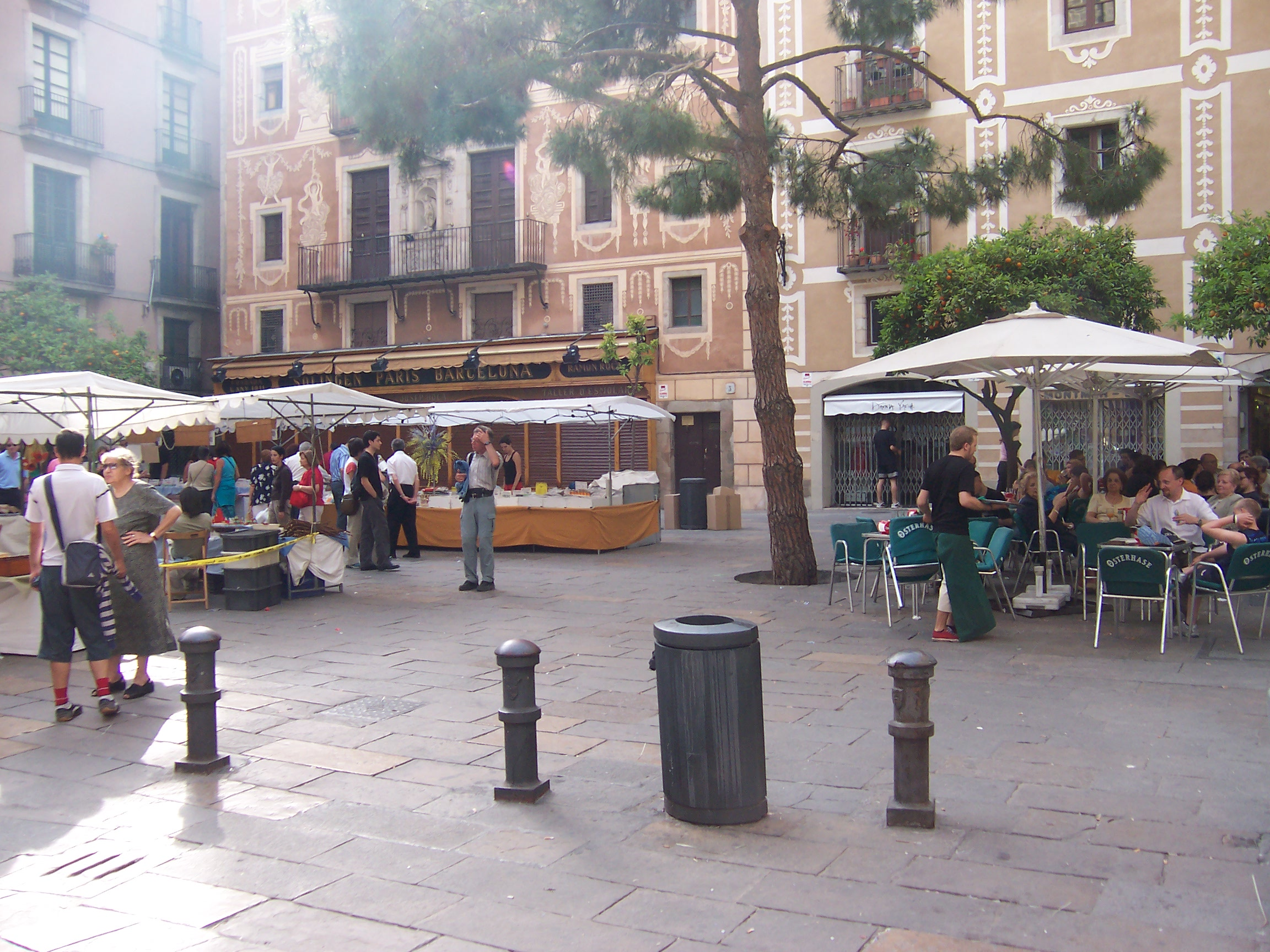
Partial view of the plaça.

Plaça del Pi or Plaza del Pino (in Spanish) is located in the Pi neighborhood within the Ciutat Vella district of Barcelona, Spain, directly in front of the main entrance of the basilica of Santa María del Pi. It occupies a flat area situated between two former streambeds and the old Roman road—now the street of La Boquería—which exited the city to the west, distinguished by the presence of a notable pine tree.

== Neighborhood ==
The Pi neighborhood exhibits several consistent characteristics that define the formation and history of its streets. These traits extend beyond the religious influence of the parish church, encompassing topographical and economic factors shaped by both the natural landscape and human activity.

This area of the city is bounded by the path of the ancient Roman wall—represented by the streets of La Palla, Banys Nous, and La Rambla—and the streets of Portaferrissa and La Boquería. Within this space, the defining features of the neighborhood are particularly evident.

== History ==
Documents from the second half of the 10th century reference a plaça known as palma, located near the city wall. This space was likely bordered by the Pi stream on one side and the sandy expanse of La Rambla on the other. The designation palma suggests a connection to other urban "palms" of the period, such as the San Justo palm, mentioned contemporaneously, and the Santa Catalina palm, noted in the 13th century. The term palma may have simply denoted a "flat area," possibly derived from the flatness of a hand's palm, as reflected in expressions like "flat as a palm."

While speculation about an early Paleochristian church lacks substantiation, a definitive document from 965 confirms the existence of a church named Santa María de ipso Pino (Saint Mary of the Pine). This record, tied to the will of Bonhom, mentions a bequest to the monastery of San Pedro de las Puellas involving an orchard located at a site called la palma de Santa María del Pino, situated just outside Barcelona's original wall. A slightly later document clarifies that this church was positioned on the western side of the city.

== Local tradition ==
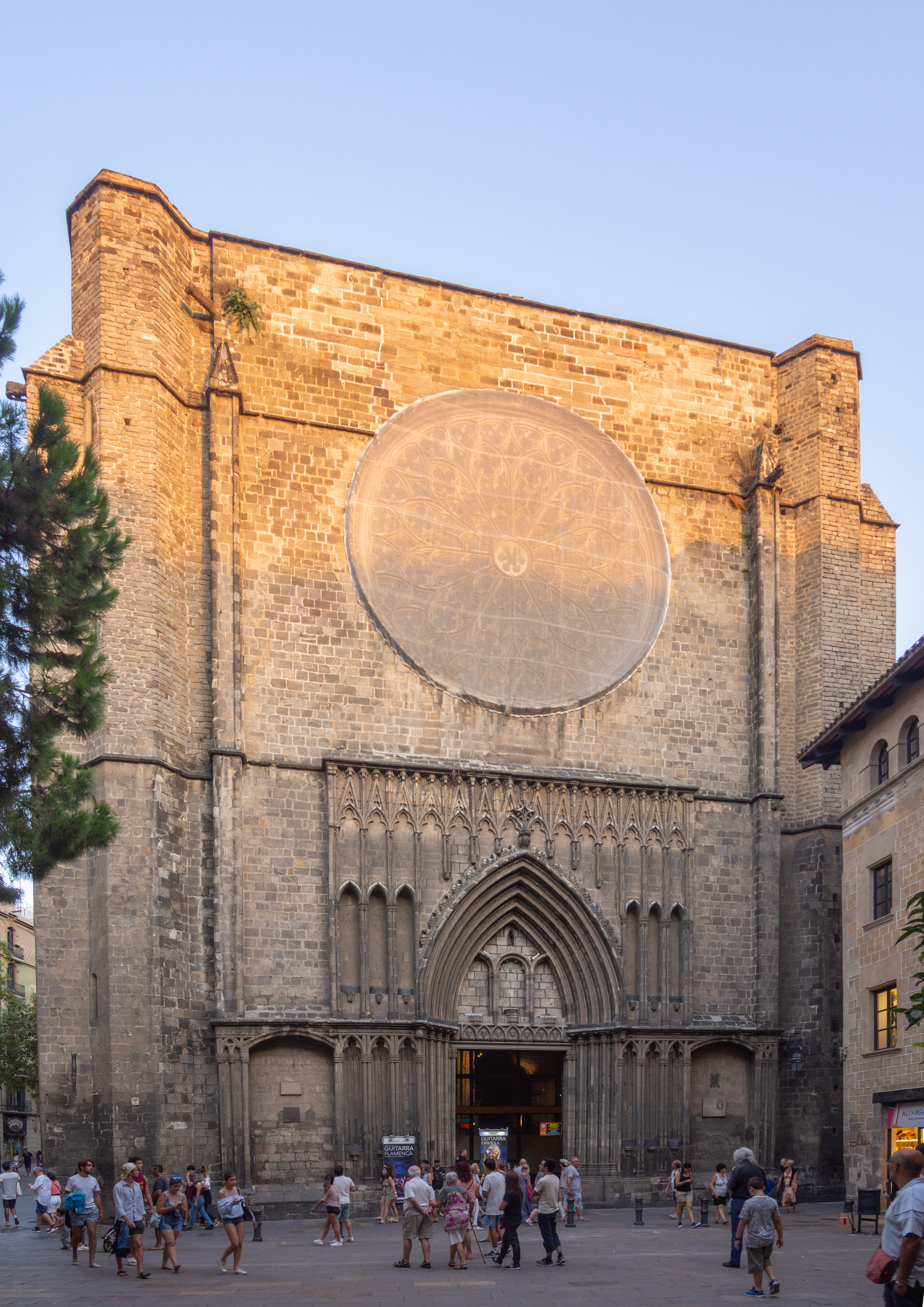
Facade of the Santa Maria del Pi church.

According to local tradition, during the Saracen invasion, the sea extended to this area, and a fishermen's quarter resisted the incursion. After the conflict subsided, a surviving fisherman reportedly discovered an image of the Virgin Mary in the crown of a pine tree. A chapel was erected on the spot, later developing into the present-day church.

The original pine was replaced over time to preserve the memory, with one successor reportedly so vigorous that its crown rose above surrounding buildings. Historical accounts suggest this prominent pine persisted until the French invasion, when a Napoleonic soldier allegedly pierced its trunk with a bayonet, causing its demise. Subsequent pines have been planted to maintain the legend's spiritual significance.

== Notable buildings ==
In addition to the Santa Maria del Pi church, the plaza features the former headquarters of the retailers' guild, its facade once adorned with elaborate sgraffito designs, now largely faded. The building includes a niche that housed an image of Archangel Saint Michael, the guild's patron, until 1936. Inside the church, the guild maintained a chapel with a 15th-century altarpiece by Jaume Huguet, of which five panels are preserved in the Museu Nacional d'Art de Catalunya. The guild also commissioned a Holy Week processional float by 19th-century sculptor Damià Campeny y Extraño.

Another significant structure is the Cofradía de la Sangre house, an example of early 17th-century urban architecture.

== Other monuments ==
Adjacent to the Plaza del Pino, in the Plaça de Sant Josep Oriol, stands a seated bronze statue of Àngel Guimerà, a replica of the one located in front of the Teatro Guimerá in Santa Cruz de Tenerife.

== Bibliography ==
- Duran i Sanpere, Agustí. Barcelona i la seva Història (in Catalan). Vol. I. Curial Editores. pp. 477–480. ISBN 84-7256-013-9.
- Grevtsova, Irina. "Anexo 2: Fichas del diagnóstico del patrimonio". Interpretación del patrimonio urbano. Una propuesta didáctica para un contexto histórico mediante las aplicaciones de telefonía móvil (PDF) (in Spanish). Universitat de Barcelona.
