= La Boqueria =

Public market in Barcelona, Spain

Coordinates: 41°22′55″N 2°10′19″E

Sant Josep de la Boqueria Market
- Mercat de Sant Josep de la Boqueria
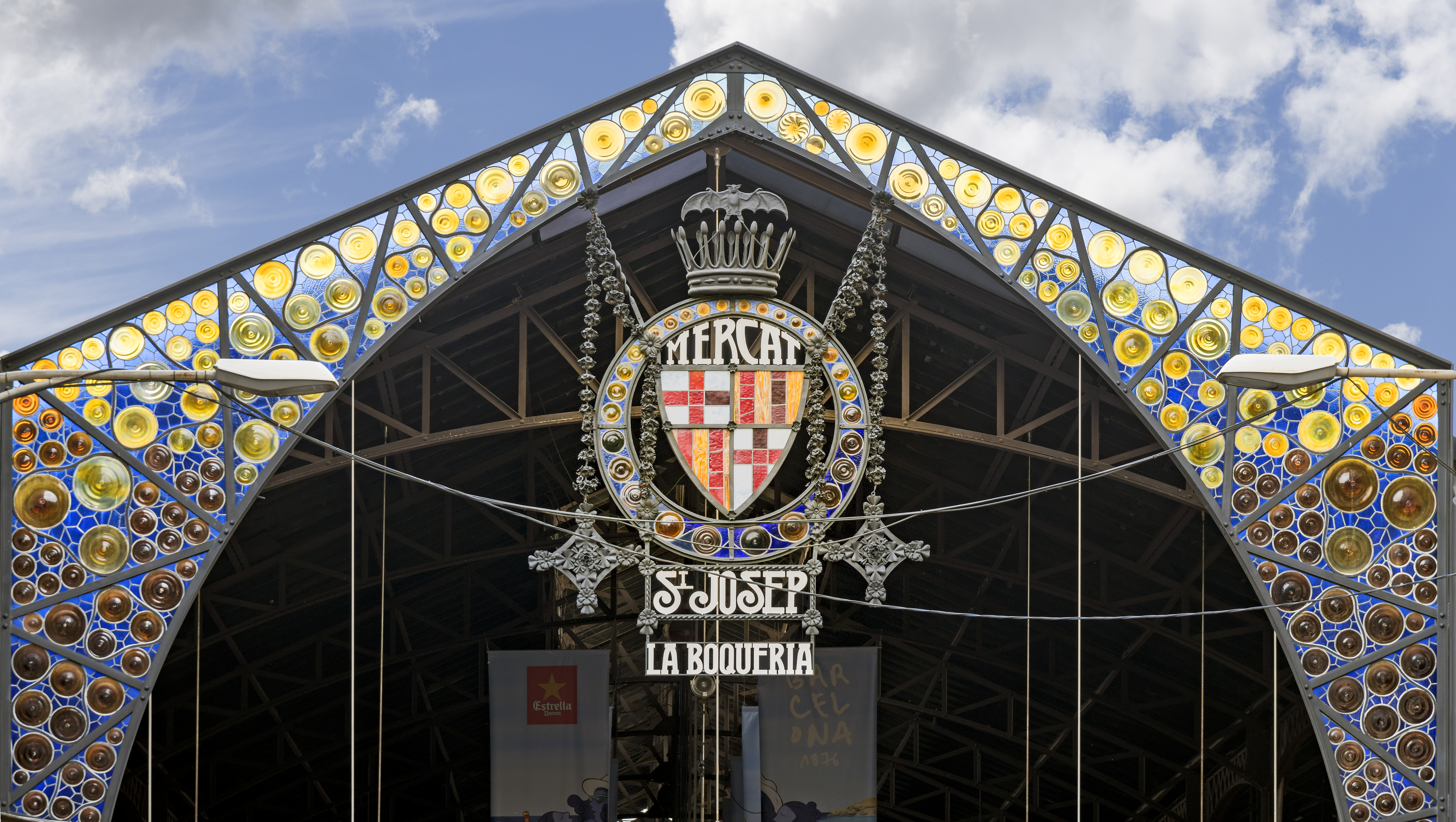
- Entrance to La Boqueria
- Interactive map of the Sant Josep de la Boqueria Market area

General information
- Type: Public market
- Location: Barcelona, Spain
- Construction started: 19 March 1840
- Inaugurated: 1853

Design and construction
- Architect: Mas Vilá

Other information
- Public transit: Liceu

Website
- Official website

The Mercat de Sant Josep de la Boqueria (Catalan: [məɾˈkad də ˈsaɲ ʒuˈzɛb də lə βukəˈɾi.ə]; Spanish: Mercado de San José de la Boquería), usually simply referred to as La Boqueria, is a large public market in the Ciutat Vella district of Barcelona, Catalonia, Spain, and one of the city's foremost tourist landmarks, with an entrance from La Rambla, not far from the Liceu, Barcelona's opera house. The market has a very diverse selection of goods.

== History ==
The first mention of the Boqueria market in Barcelona dates from 1217, when tables were installed near the old city gate to sell meat. From December 1470 onwards, a pig market was held at this site; at this time it was known as Mercadi Bornet. Later, until 1794, it was known simply as Mercat de la Palla, or straw market. In the beginning, the market was not enclosed and had no official status, being regarded simply as an extension of the Plaça Nova market, which extended to the Plaça del Pi. The current name is believed to derive from the Catalan boc, meaning "goat", therefore a boqueria would be a place where goat meat is sold; compare also French boucherie, whence Vuccirìa, the name of a market in Palermo, Italy.

Later, the authorities decided to construct a separate market on La Rambla, housing mainly fishmongers and butchers. It was not until 1826 that the market was legally recognized, and a convention held in 1835, decided to build an official structure. Construction began on 19 March 1840, under the direction of architect Mas Vilá. The market officially opened in the same year, but the plans for the building were modified many times. The inauguration of the structure finally took place in 1853. A new fish market opened in 1911, and the metal roof that still exists today was constructed in 1914.

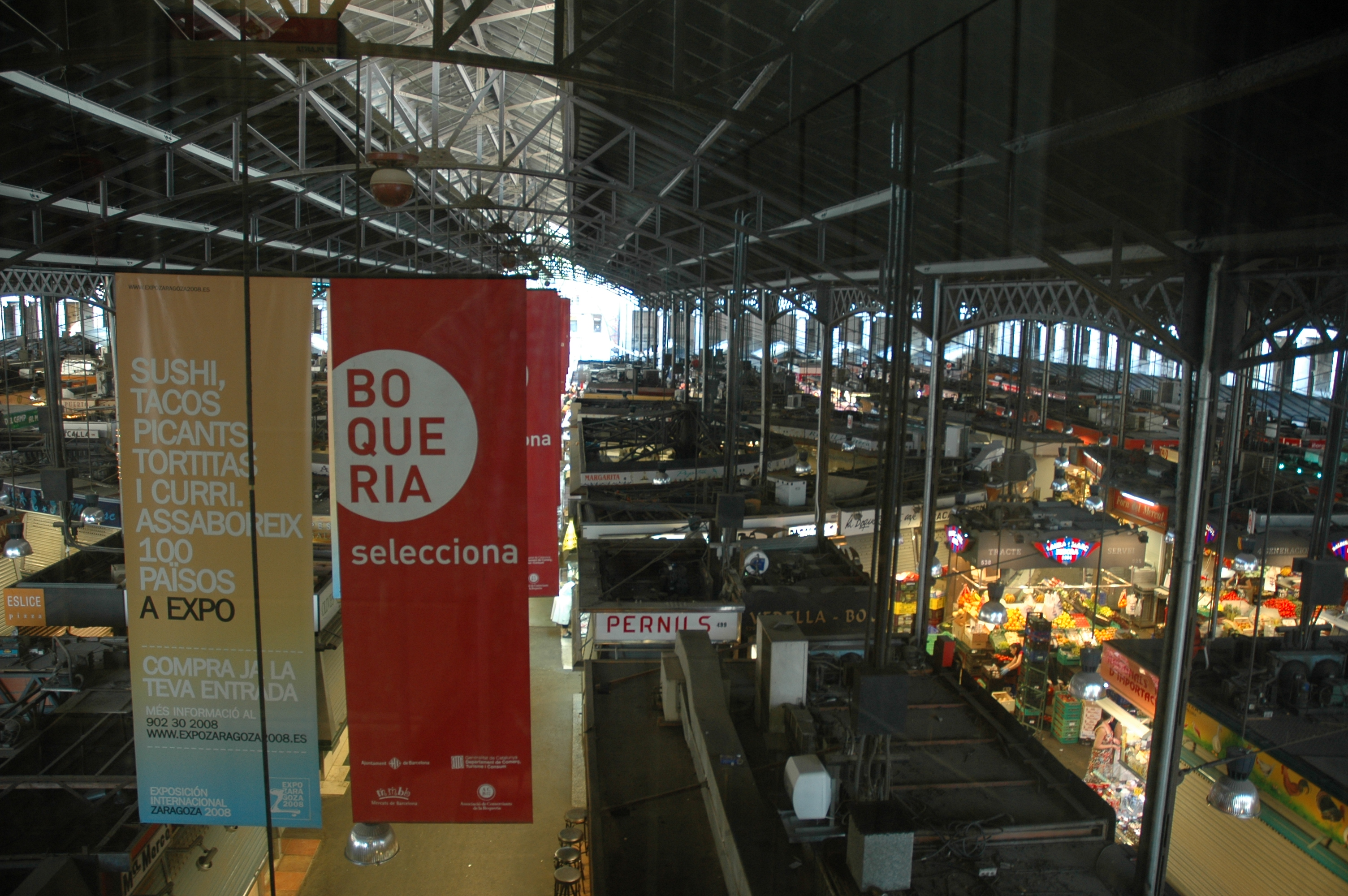
Market structure

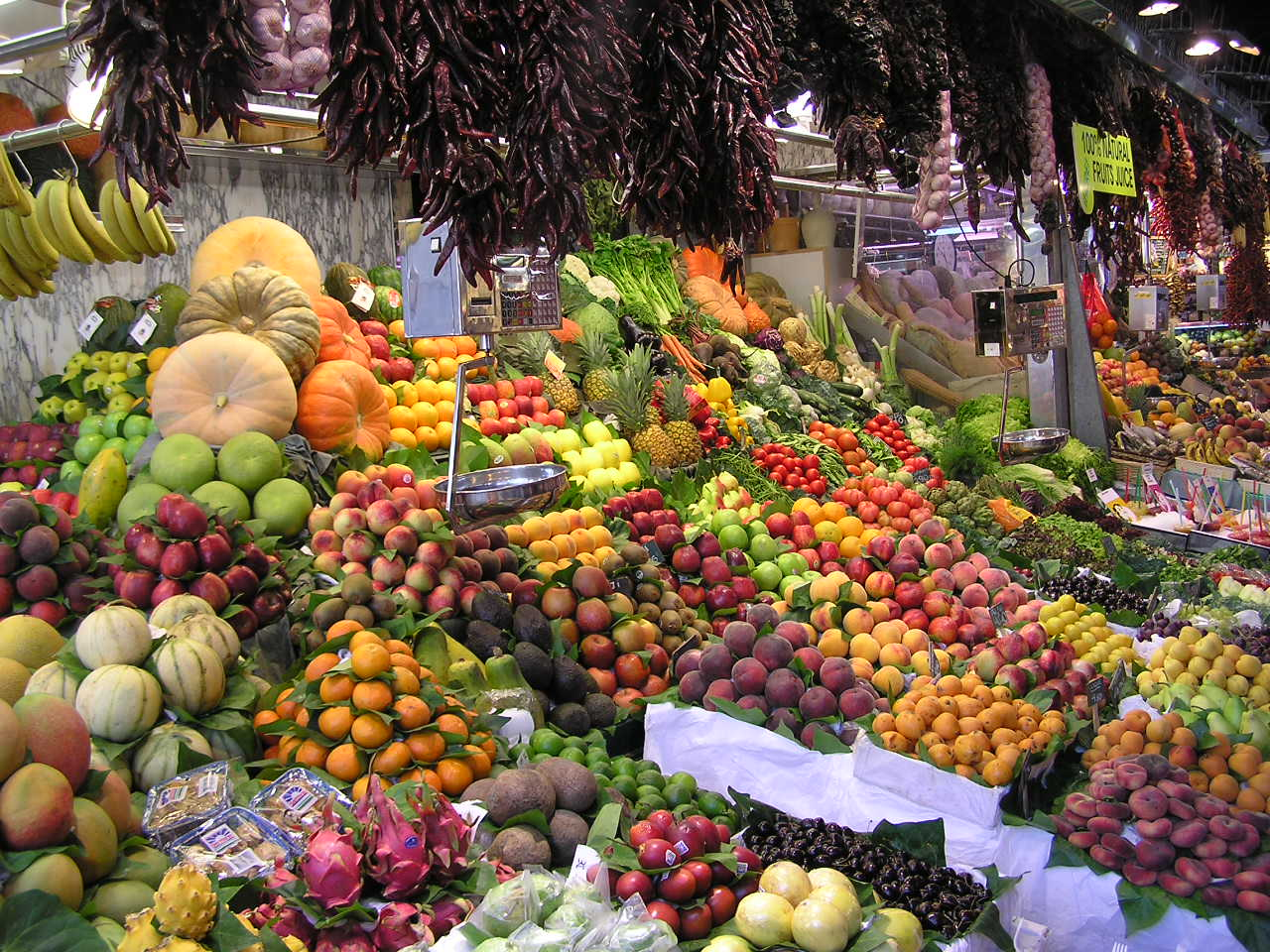
Fruits and vegetables for sale

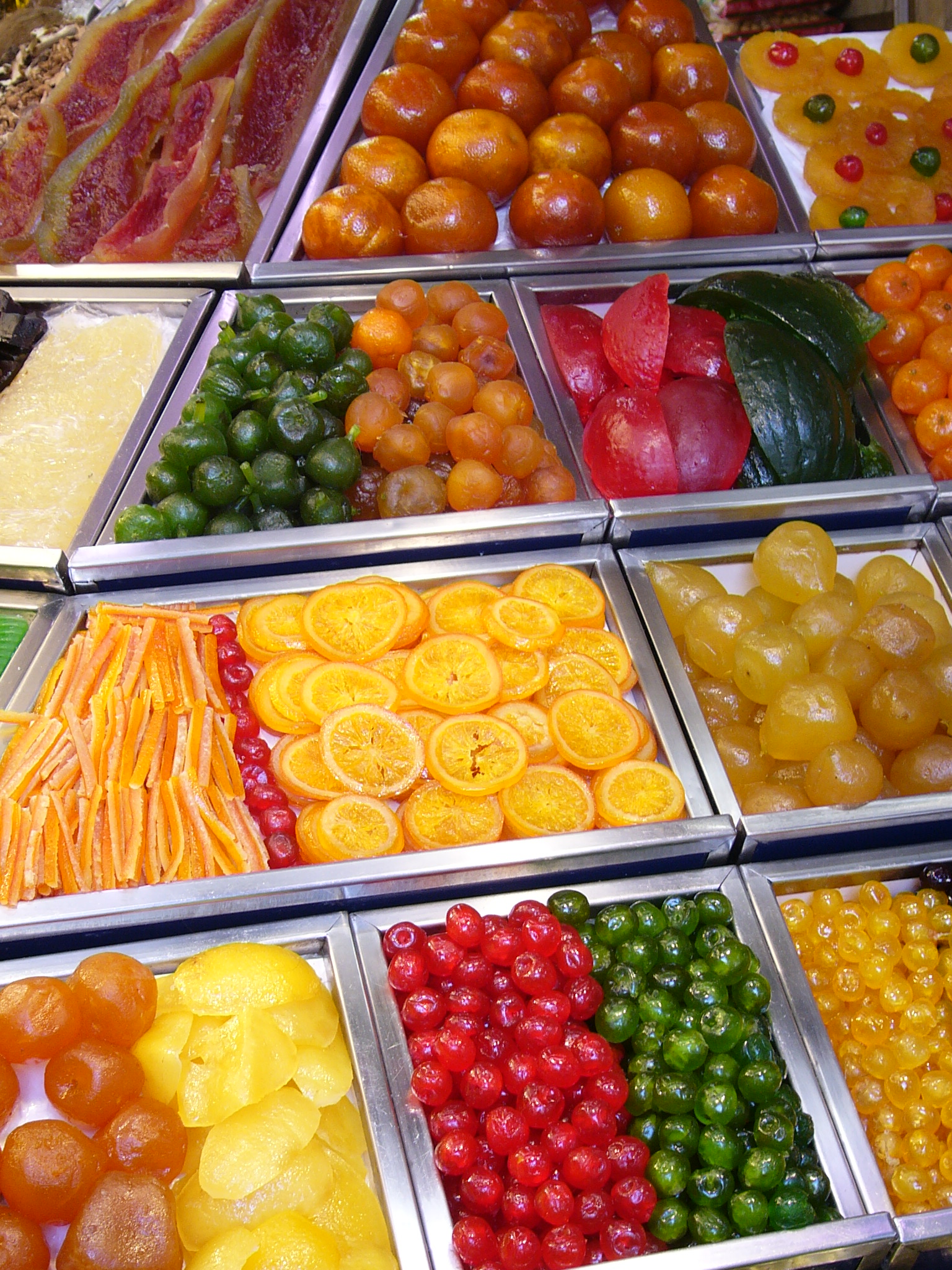
Candied fruit on display

== See also ==
- List of markets in Barcelona
