= Virreina Palace =

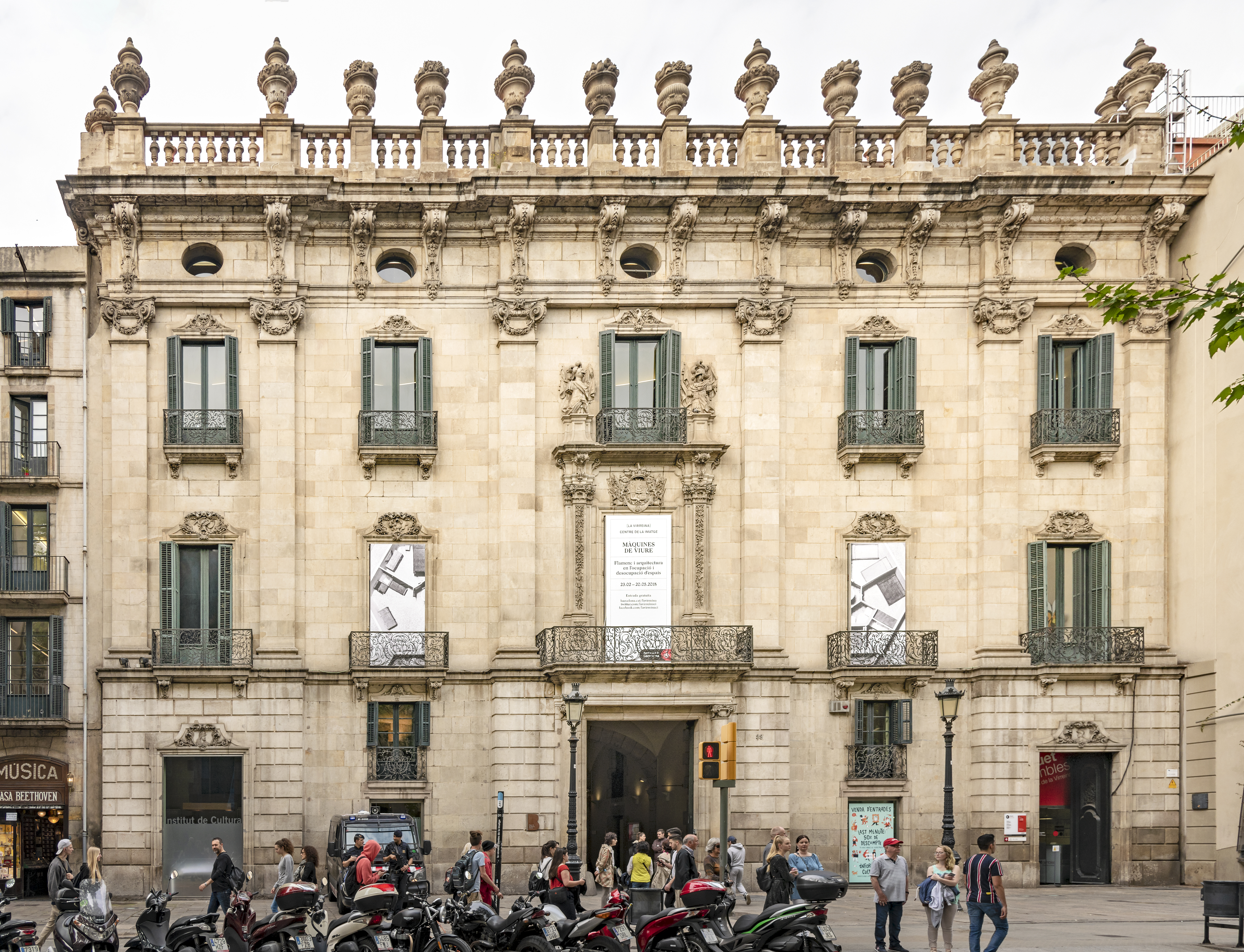
- The palace's frontage
- Interactive map of the Virreina Palace area

General information
- Type: Historical Building
- Architectural style: Baroque–rococo
- Location: Barcelona, Spain
- Coordinates: 41.382492°N 2.171667°E
- Current tenants: Institut de Cultura de Barcelona
- Construction started: 1772
- Completed: 1778
- Client: Manuel d'Amat i de Junyent

Design and construction
- Architect: Carles Grau

Website
- Official website

The Virreina Palace (Catalan: Palau de la Virreina; Spanish: Palacio de la Virreina) is a building in the city of Barcelona. Situated on the famous La Rambla avenue, today it houses the headquarters of the City Council's Culture Institute, the Institut de Cultura de Barcelona (ICUB) and hosts various temporary art exhibitions and cultural events.

The palace was built, between 1772 and 1778, for Manuel d'Amat i de Junyent, who was Viceroy of Peru between 1761 and 1776. It is named for his wife, virreina meaning vicereine in the Catalan language. The architect was Carles Grau, and the palace was built in a style between baroque and rococo. Grau, also a sculptor, created the window hoods and the vases which decorate the building's skyline.

On the exterior of the palace is a statue of Our Lady of the Rosary, created by Luisa Granero in 1967.

== Gallery ==
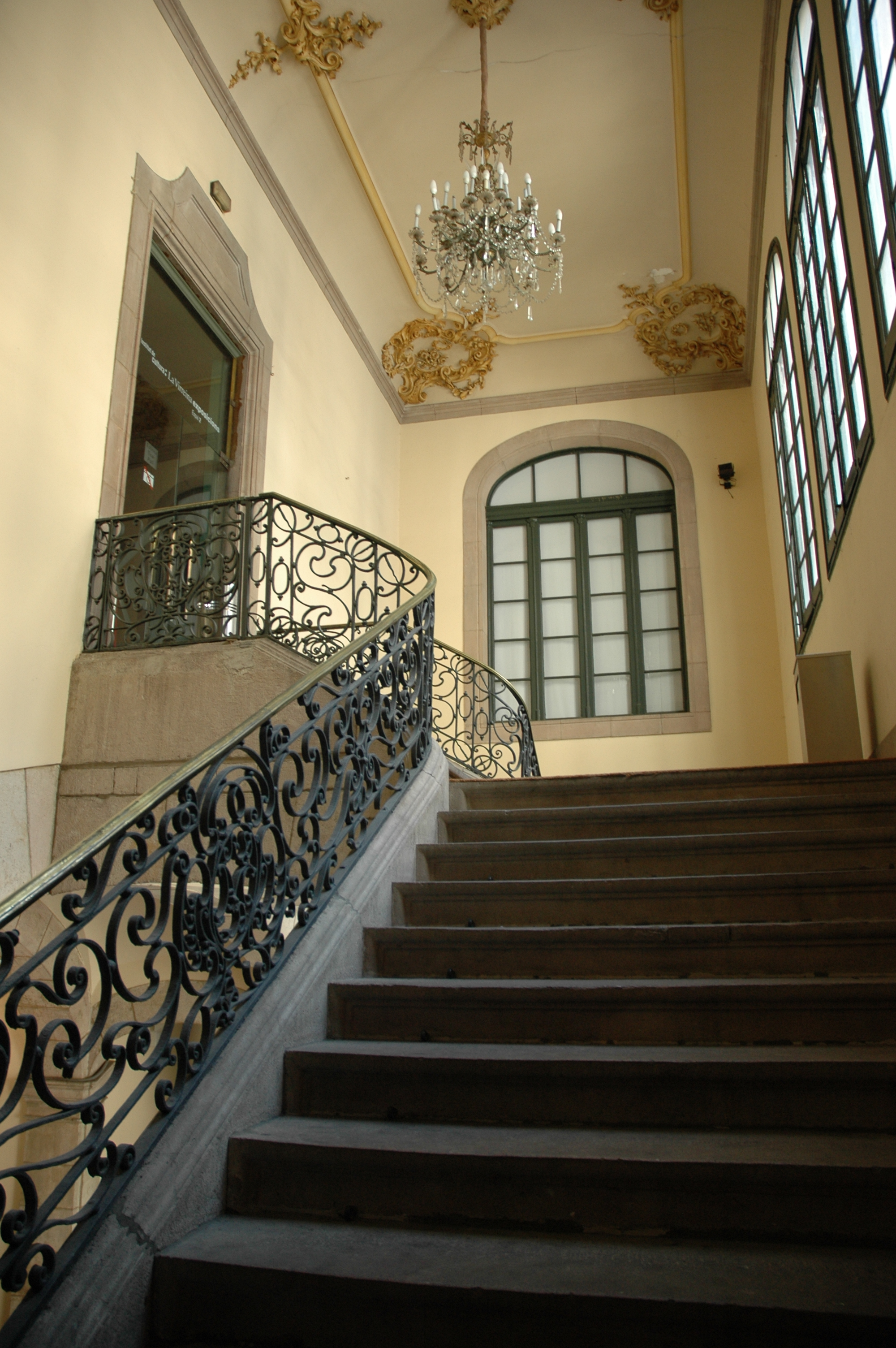
Staircase

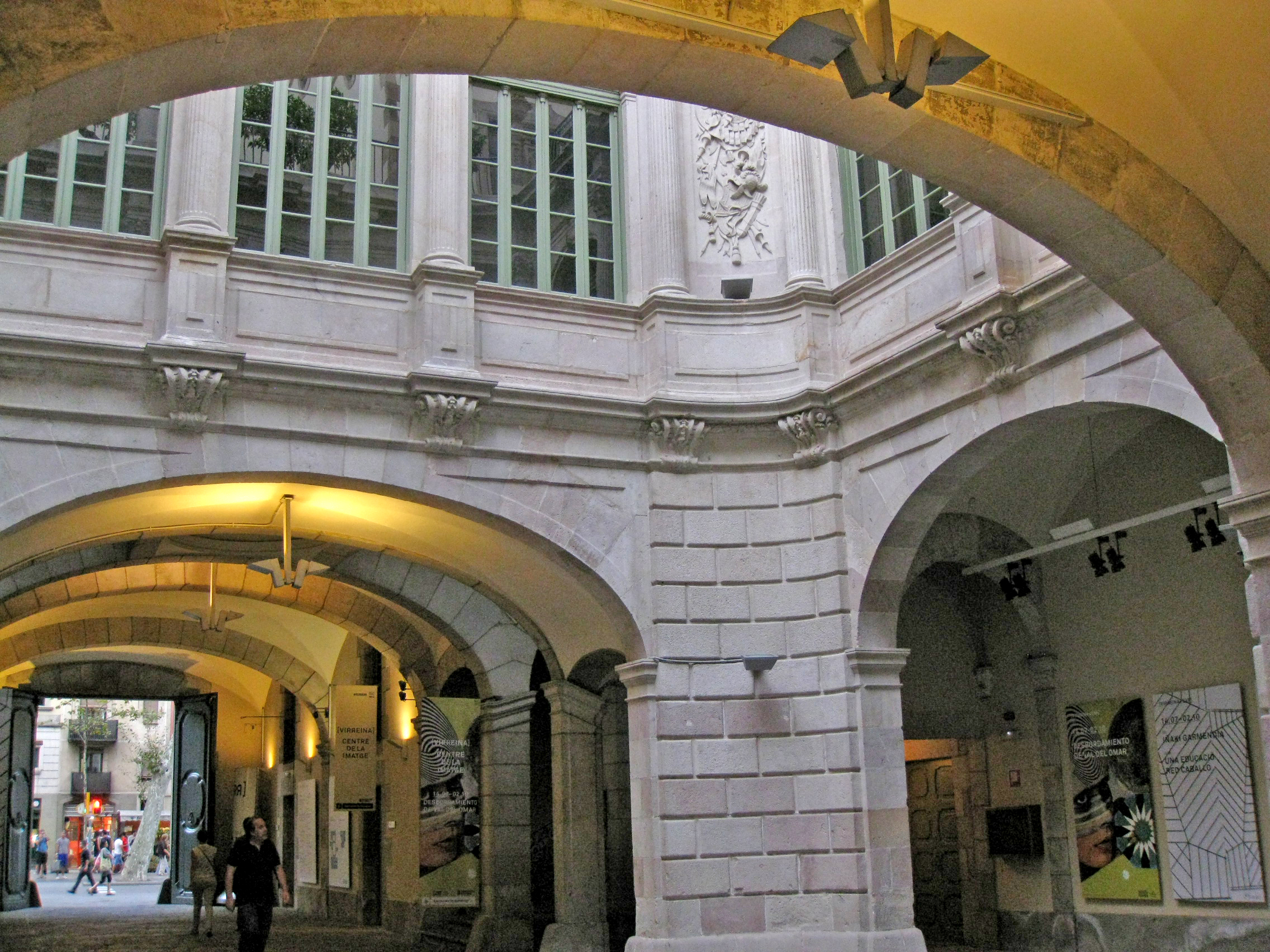
Interior of the palace

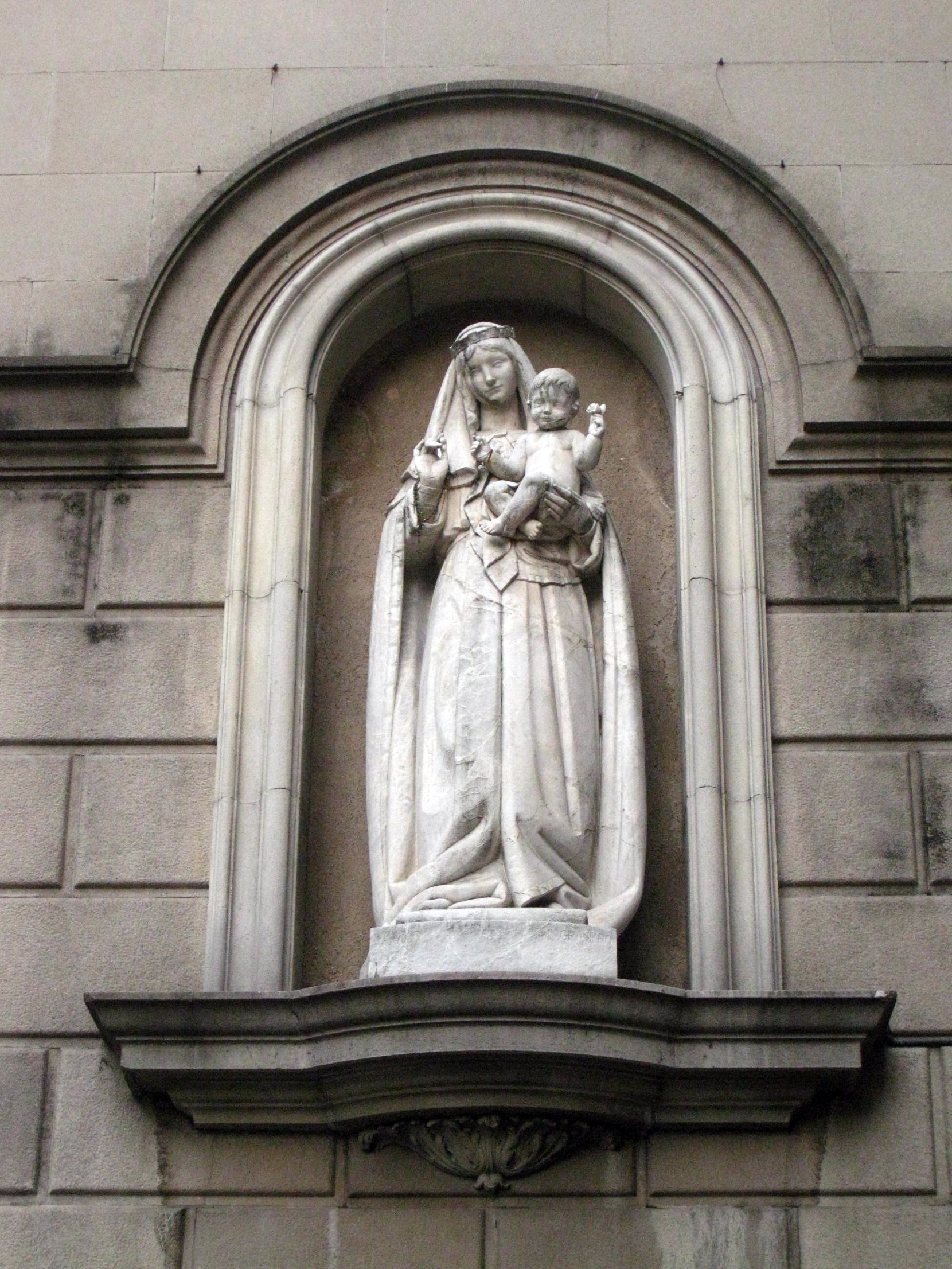
Statue of Our Lady of the Rosary
