= Font de Canaletes =

Fountain in Barcelona, Spain

Coordinates: 41°23′7″N 2°10′12.5″E

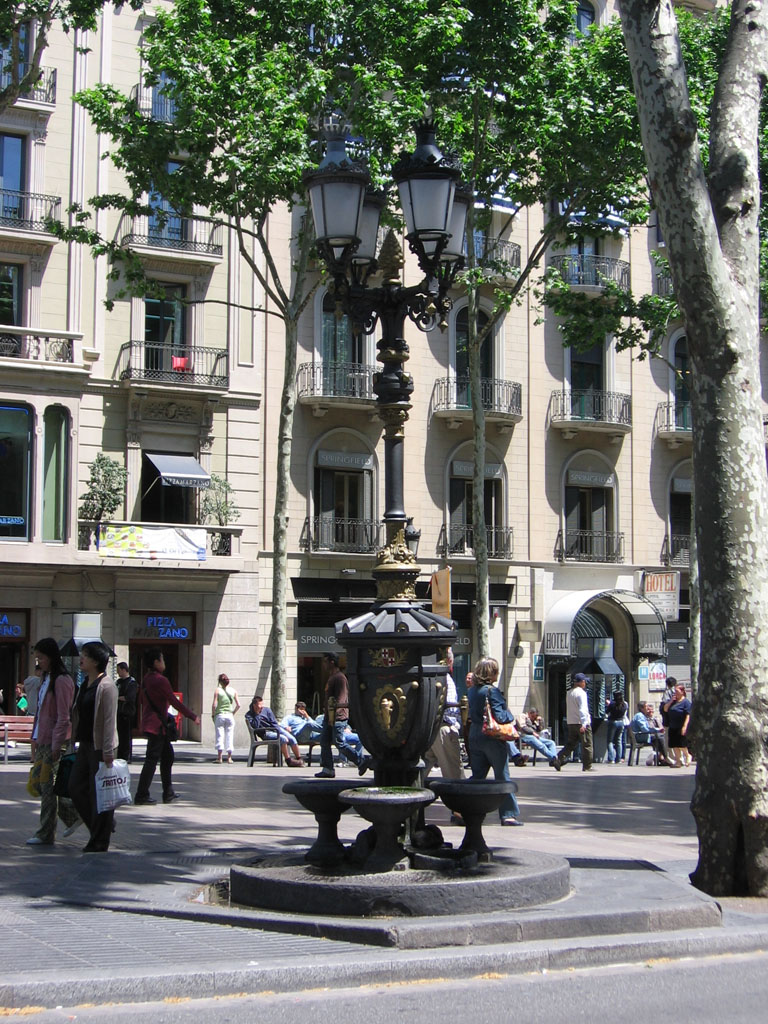
- Font de Canaletes
- Interactive map of Font de Canaletes
- Location: Barcelona, Catalonia, Spain
- Type: Fountain
- Opening date: 1892

Font de Canaletes (Spanish: Fuente de Canaletas) is an ornate fountain, crowned by a lamp post, in Barcelona, Catalonia, in Rambla de Canaletes, the upper part of La Rambla, near Plaça de Catalunya.

It is a fixture of football fans after Barça football matches since the 1930s.

Tradition has that the one who drinks from the Font de Canaletes will come back to Barcelona, as the inscription on the floor suggests. The fountain is named after the northern wall of the city (dating from the 14th century), called Canaletes because of the water pipes that went through it supplying Barcelona's old city.

== History ==
The original fountain from the 18th century came from a deposit located in the Torre de Sant Sever of the old medieval walls, which supplied the area of Les Rambles and the Raval. It had a cistern that already received the name of Canaletes, perhaps because of the multiple channels that from here provided to diverse fountains of the zone. With the demolition of the walls in the 19th century the old fountain disappeared, when the tower was demolished in 1862, and in its place two temporary iron fountains were installed. In 1888 the City Council of Barcelona agreed to replace it with another definitive fountain, in the whole of a project of four fountains-lampposts located in different parts of the city, a project that was commissioned to Pere Falqués. Subsequently, the project was expanded to fourteen fountains, commissioned to Jaume Rodelles. The current Font de Canaletes was built in 1892.
