= List of markets in Barcelona =

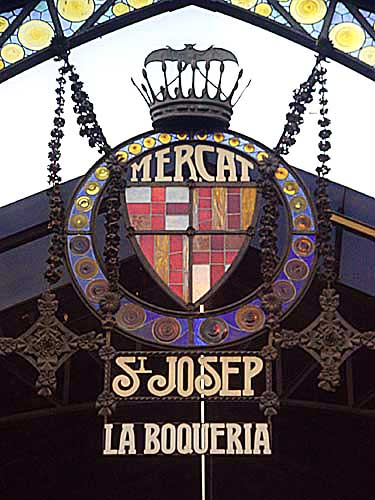
La Boqueria

The city of Barcelona has a great many neighborhood markets that provide meat, fish, produce, and more on a daily basis, and are still vital to the urban life of the city. Many of the city's historic markets date to the mid-to-late 19th century, as the city was experiencing rapid growth due to the creation of the Eixample. Each neighborhood has at least one market and many have up to 4. Markets in the city are typically large enclosed spaces located centrally in the neighborhoods they serve. The larger markets are arranged into departments depending on the product. In addition, there exist many non-food based markets around the city, such as those that offer art or secondhand goods. The city's oldest markets are located in the Ciutat Vella and Eixample, with newer markets along the fringes of the city. Many of the older markets, such as La Boqueria, not only provide food and goods for their surrounding neighborhoods, but are tourist attractions in their own right, as they provide an essential glimpse into everyday life in the city. The markets are administered under the Mercats Municipals de Barcelona wing of the city's government.

== La Boqueria ==
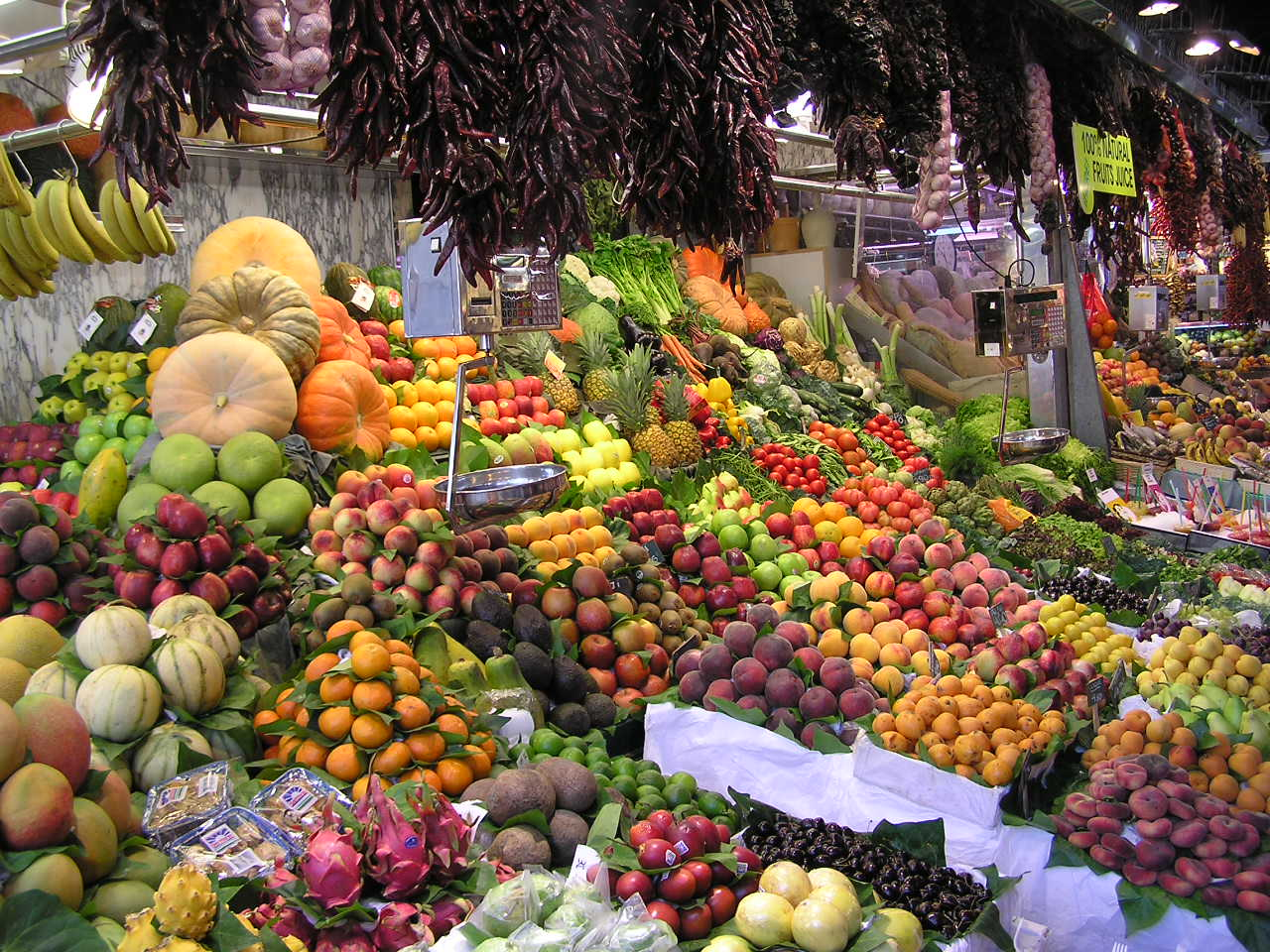
Fruit at La Boqueria

The Boqueria is the most well known market in the city of Barcelona. It houses the best and most well known producers and specializes in the sale of fresh produce, seafood, meats (specifically Jamón Iberico) and tapas. Also well known are the candies and fresh juices found on the Rambla side of the market. The first known mention of the Boqueria came in 1217, when meat sales began to take place near the old door to the city. In December 1470, the marketplace began to specialize in the sale of pigs. These transitions came and passed as the marketplace functioned under the names El Mercat Bornet and El Mercat de la Palla (Straw Market) until 1794 when it began to be referred to as the Boqueria. The market was still unenclosed and functioning as an extension of the Mercat de Placa Nova until the government decided to make it an independent market off the Rambla for the sale of meats and fish. In 1826, it was legally recognized. On March 19, 1840, construction began under the direction of architect Mas Vilà. The market opened in the same year but was not officially inaugurated until 1854. In 1911, the new fish market opened and in 1914, the metal roof, which still covers the market, was built.

== Mercat de Sant Antoni ==
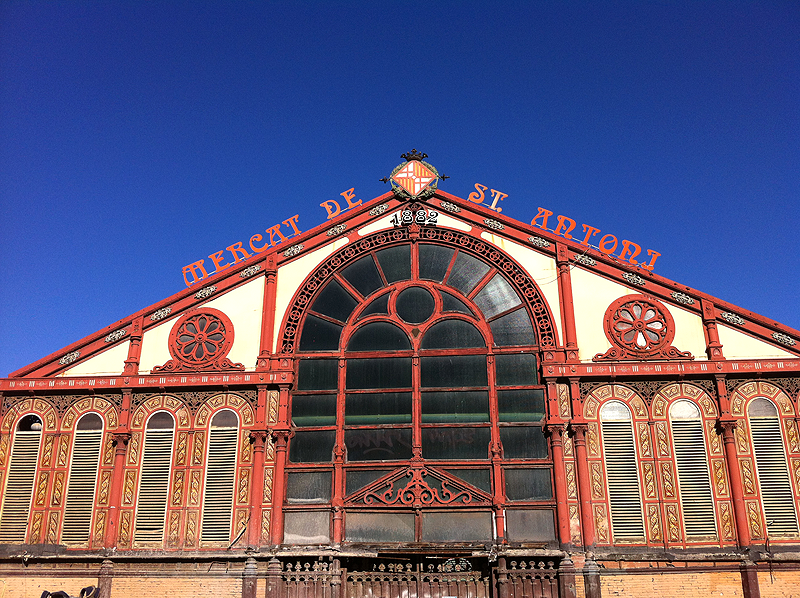
The front of the Mercat Sant Antoni

The Mercat de Sant Antoni is one of the largest markets in the city of Barcelona. It was built according to Ildefonso Cerdà’s original, nature-based city plan (Greek-cross style plan inset in a larger square) by Antoni Rovira i Tras in 1882 in a triangle of Eixample blocks in between El Raval and Poble Sec. The metal structure covers an entire block of the Raval. Items sold include fresh produce, meats and fish. It is known for its book and coin market that is held outside on Sundays. In 2015, the market building closed for renovations, and the market itself is housed in a temporary building next door until 2017.

== Mercat de Santa Caterina ==
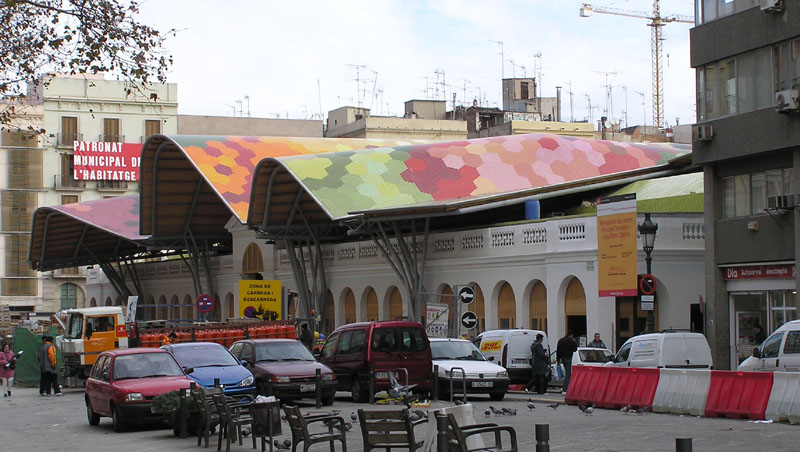
The newly renovated Mercat de Santa Caterina

Located in La Ribera just off the Via Laietana, the Mercat de Santa Caterina has been in operation since 1848. It was recently remodeled in 2005 by Enric Miralles and Benedetta Tagliabue. The remodel included a roof in the form of a multicolored ceramic wave, which sits atop the wooden walls that enclose the market. During the remodeling, the market was relocated to the stretch of the Passeig de Sant Joan in between the Arc de Triomf and the city's Parc de la Ciutadella.

The market now serves an area also previously served by the Mercat del Born, which has been converted into an archaeological site preserving the foundations of the older neighborhood underneath its roof. Inside are numerous food stalls as well as restaurants.

== Mercat de la Barceloneta ==
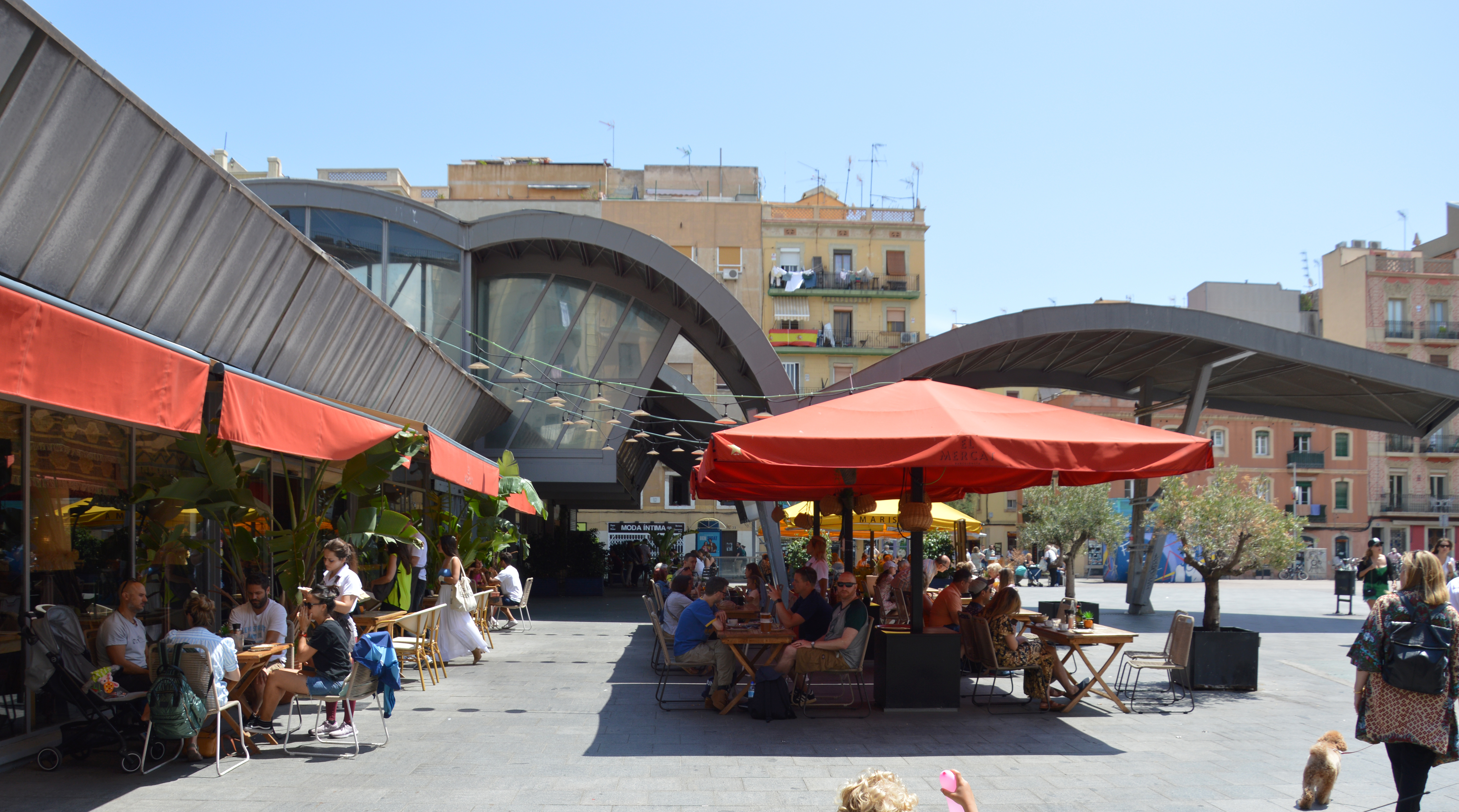
Mercat de la Barceloneta

The Mercat de la Barceloneta, like the Mercat de Santa Caterina dates from 1848. While originally an open-air market, it has since been enclosed.

== Mercat de la Concepció ==
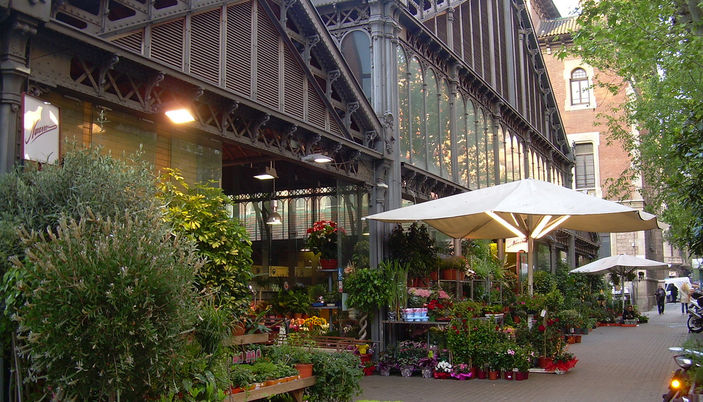
Mercat de la Concepció

The Mercat de la Concepció is well known for its flowers. Built in 1888 by Antoni Rovira i Trias, this Eixample market, which spans an entire block, was constructed using iron, a revolutionary new architectural form that gained prominence around this time. It was completely remodeled in 1998 due to its outdated nature and lack of necessary amenities. Some of the improvements included reorganizing the market, evolving its offerings, adding new technology, and improving basic elements of the market such as parking availability.

== Mercat del Ninot ==
The Mercat del Ninot is located in the western portion of the Eixample. Its current building dates from 1933.

== Mercat d'Hostafrancs ==
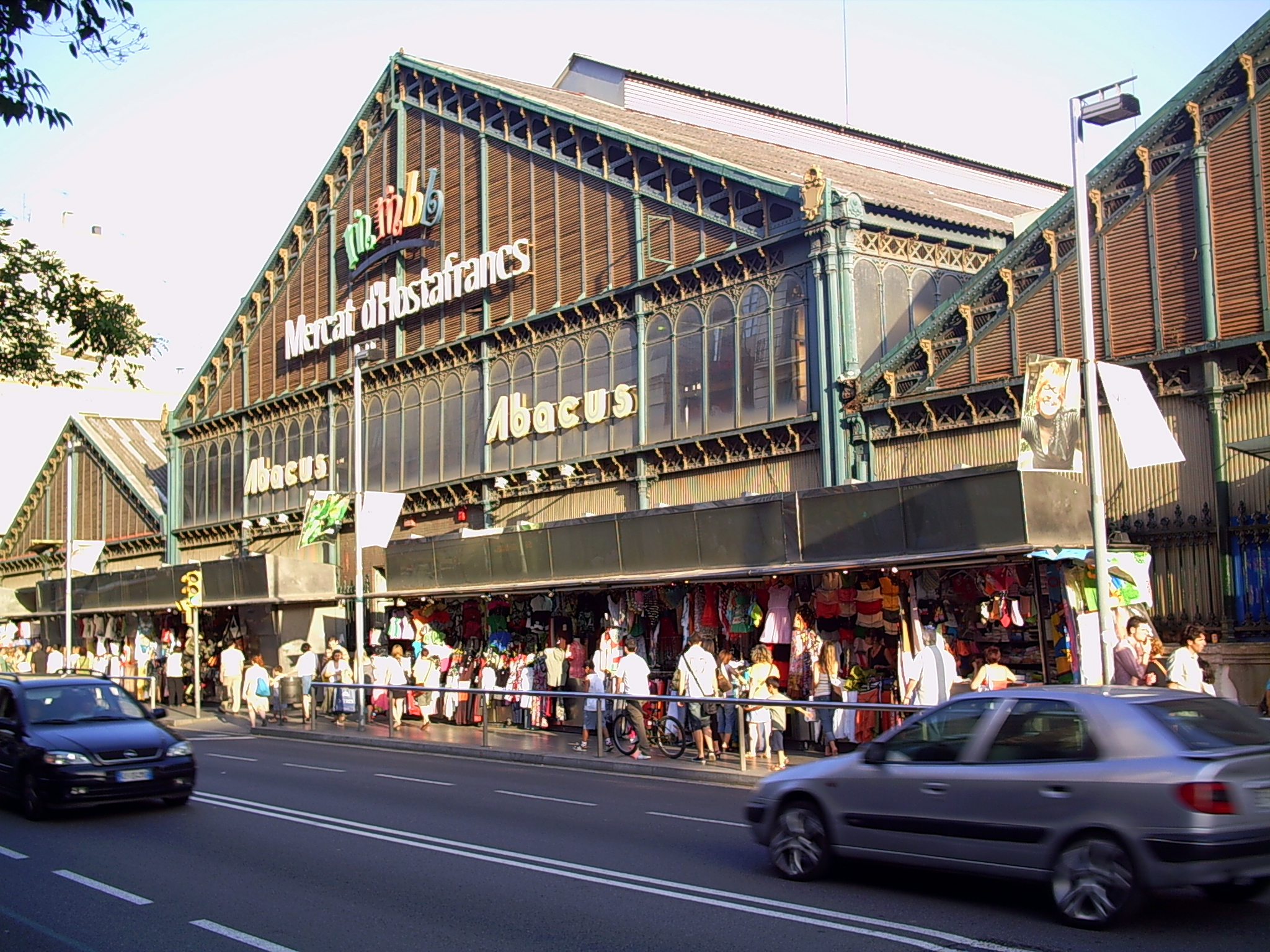
Mercat d'Hostafrancs

The Mercat d'Hostafrancs is one of the larger markets in the western part of the city. It is located near Montjuic.

== Mercat de Sants ==
Located in the Sants district, this market dates from 1913

== Mercat del Fort Pienc ==
The Mercat del Fort Pienc is one of the city's newest markets, dating from 2003

== Mercat de Poblenou ==
One of the few markets serving the Poblenou area, the Mercat de Poblenou has served its neighborhood since 1913.

== Pintors del Pi Market ==
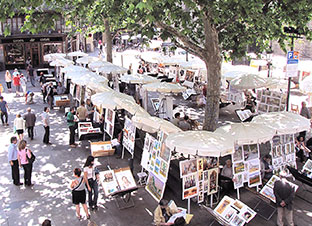
Pintors Pi Market

One of the most famous art markets in the city of Barcelona is the Mercadillo de la Placa de Sant Josep, also known as the Pintors del Pi market. Situated in the Placa de Sant Josep Oriol i Pi just under the church of Santa Maria del Pi, the market began in the 1970s when a group of Catalan artists decided to meet up to bring art to the streets of the city. Many different types of art are represented, including watercolors and oils, and representations vary from cityscapes to portraits. The market opens every weekend and usually showcases around 15 artists.

== El Mercat dels Encants ==
El Mercat dels Encants is Barcelona’s biggest and most recognized secondhand market. This newly renovated market next to Las Glorias Square is well known for its aggressive architectural style. Fermín Vásquez Arquitectos, the group that designed the building, did not want the building to appear as a shopping center. This led to the design of a wall-less, continuous space, with ramps and elevated “floors” that loop around the entire structure. Notable items include furniture, clothing and books on the upper floors, and the second-hand items are primarily on the ground floor level. The market is open on Mondays, Wednesdays, Fridays, and Saturdays.

== El Mercat Gotic ==
El Mercat Gotic is an antique market located in the gothic quarter of Barcelona, next to the Catedral de Santa Eulàlia. The market showcases secondhand items, mostly art pieces. Some notable items include ceramics, candles, dolls and other rare objects. The market opens every Thursday except in August.

== Fira de Nadal de la Sagrada Familia ==
The Fira de Nadal de la Sagrada Familia is an annual open-air Christmas market that has been held at the Sagrada Familia since 1960, normally from November 29 to December 23. Items sold include Christmas trees, figurines, toys, gifts, food, and art. The market is popular among families with children due to the appearance of Santa Claus.

== Other Markets ==
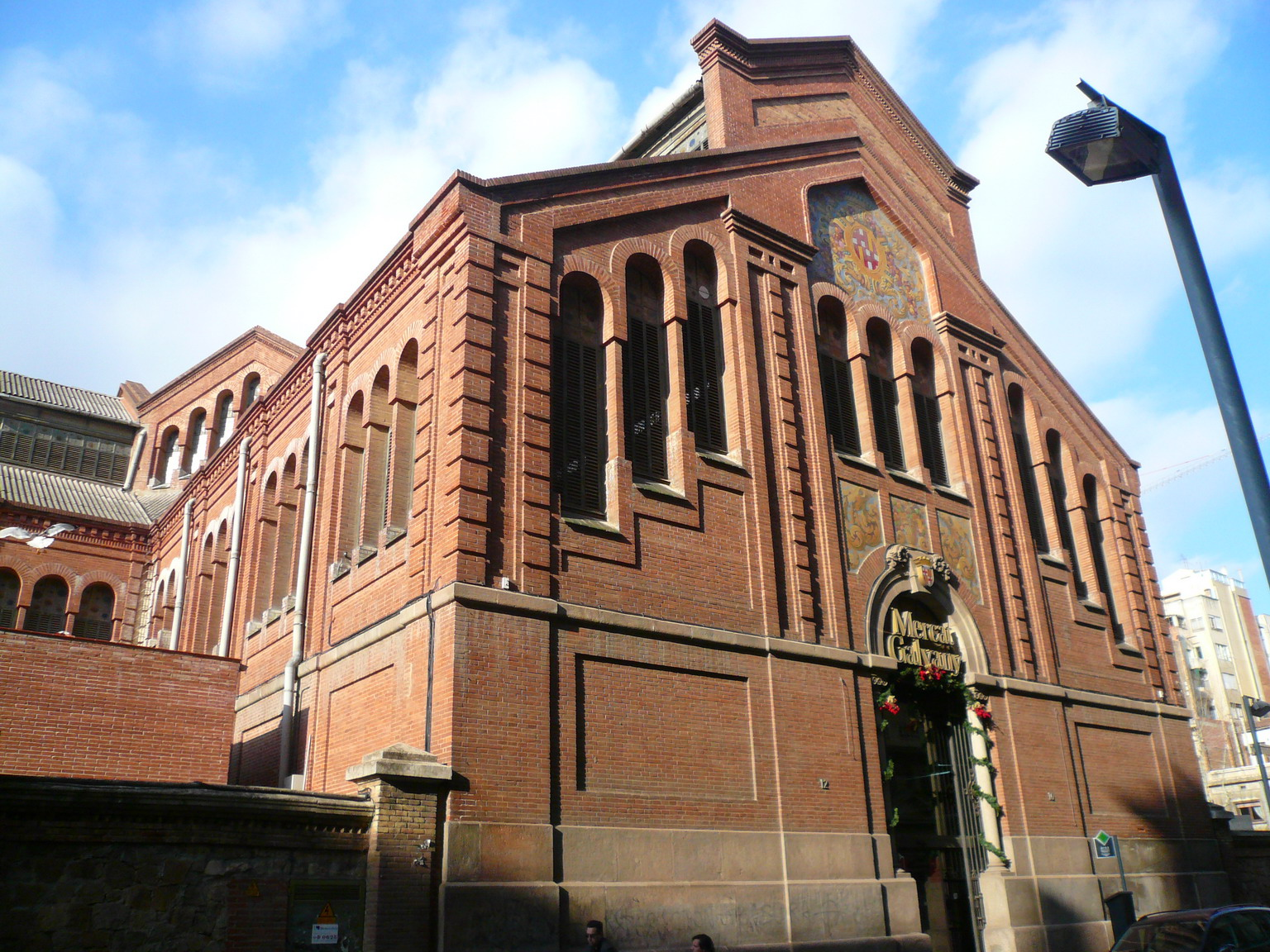
Mercat de Galvany in the Sarria-Sant Gervasi district.

In addition to its larger, more central markets, the city of Barcelona also contains many more neighborhood markets under its care.

- In the Eixample, the Mercat de la Sagrada Família was opened in 1973.
- In Sants-Montjuïc, the Mercat de la Marina can be found.
- The Les Corts district contains a market by the same name.
- Sarrià - Sant Gervasi contains four markets: Mercat de Galvany, Mercat de Sant Gervasi, Mercat de les Tres Torres, and the Mercat de Vallvidrera
- In Gràcia, the Mercat de l'Abaceria Central, the Mercat de l'Estrella, the Mercat de Lesseps, and the Mercat de la Llibertat can be found.
- in Horta-Guinardó, the Mercat del Guinardó, Mercat del Carmel, Mercat d'Horta, and the Mercat de la Vall d'Hebron have been established.
- Nou Barris contains the markets La Mercè, La Guineueta, Canyelles, Montserrat, La Trinitat, Ciutat Meridiana, and Núria
- The three markets that serve the Sant Andreu district are the Mercat de Felip II, the Mercat de Sant Andreu, and the Mercat del Bon Pastor
- In Sant Martí neighborhoods are served by the Mercat del Clot, the Mercat de Provençals, the Mercat de Sant Martí, and the Mercat del Besòs.

== See also ==
- List of theatres and concert halls in Barcelona
- List of museums in Barcelona
