= La Rambla, Barcelona =

Thoroughfare in Barcelona, Spain

La Rambla
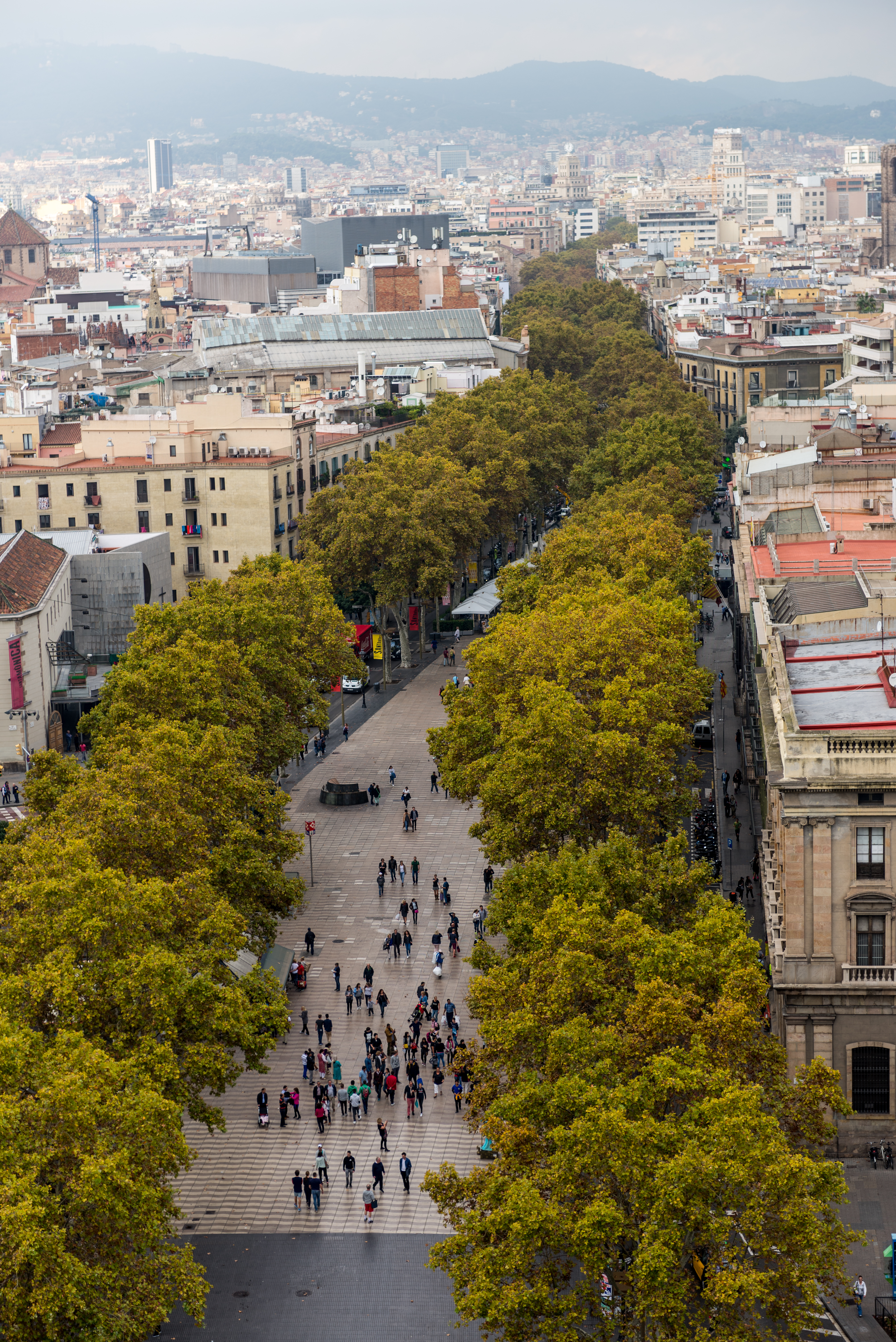
- View over the Rambla from the Christopher Columbus monument, with the neighbourhoods of El Raval to the left and Barri Gòtic to the right
- Interactive map of La Rambla
- Length: 1.2 km (0.75 mi)
- Location: Barcelona, Catalonia, Spain
- Coordinates: 41°22′53″N 2°10′23″E
- From: Plaça de Catalunya
- To: Christopher Columbus Monument

La Rambla (Catalan pronunciation: [lə ˈramblə]) is considered the most well known street in central Barcelona. A tree-lined pedestrian street, it stretches for 1.2 kilometres (3/4 mile) connecting the Plaça de Catalunya in its center with the Christopher Columbus Monument at Port Vell. La Rambla forms the boundary between the neighbourhoods of the Barri Gòtic to the east and the El Raval to the west.

La Rambla can be crowded, especially during the height of the tourist season. It hosts a combination of eateries, shops, markets, and cultural institutions.

The Spanish poet Federico García Lorca once said that La Rambla was "the only street in the world which I wish would never end."

== Orientation ==
Map of La Rambla

La Rambla can be considered a series of shorter streets, each differently named, hence the plural form Les Rambles (the original Catalan form; in Spanish it is Las Ramblas). The street is successively called:

- Rambla de Canaletes – the site of the Font de Canaletes fountain
- Rambla dels Estudis – the site of the former Jesuit University, whose only remainder is the Church of Bethlehem
- Rambla de Sant Josep (or de les Flors) – the site of an open-air flower market
- Rambla dels Caputxins – the site of a former Capuchin monastery, now dominated by the Liceu opera-house
- Rambla de Santa Mònica – an arts center named after the convent of St. Monica.

To the north of La Rambla lies Plaça de Catalunya, a large square in central Barcelona that is generally considered to be both Barcelona's city center and the place where the old city and the 19th century-built Eixample converge.

To the east of La Rambla is the Barri Gòtic or Gothic Quarter, the heart of the old city of Barcelona. The Barri Gòtic retains a labyrinthine street plan, with small squares and streets, many of which connect onto the Rambla. One of the larger of these squares is the Plaça Reial, a lively 19th-century square with tall palm trees and street lamps designed by Antoni Gaudí, which opens down a short entrance passage off the Rambla dels Caputxins. Further into the Barri Gòtic can be found the Cathedral of Santa Eulàlia and the Plaça Sant Jaume that houses the buildings of the Generalitat of Catalonia and Barcelona's City Council.

To the west of La Rambla is the rather different El Raval quarter. Outside the city's earliest walls, this area was originally the site of various religious and medical institutions. Later factories grew up along with housing for the workers, whilst the proximity to the port led to the area becoming known for its nightlife and clubs, as well as prostitution and crime. Today the area still retains a degree of 'edge', but it also home to several important buildings, including Gaudí's Palau Güell, which is only a few steps down the Carrer Nou de la Rambla from the Rambla dels Caputxins.

At the southern end of the Rambla is the Christopher Columbus Monument and the Port Vell, the old port of Barcelona, now largely given over to pleasure craft. Near to the port end of the Rambla are the Royal Dockyards (Catalan: Drassanes), which house a maritime museum specifically devoted to naval history in the Mediterranean.

Extensions at either end of the Rambla also carry the name Rambla, but are not normally considered part of La Rambla itself. To the north, the Rambla de Catalunya extends into the Eixample district. To the south, construction of the Maremàgnum in the early 1990s resulted in a continuation of La Rambla on a wooden walkway into the Rambla de Mar harbor.

== History ==
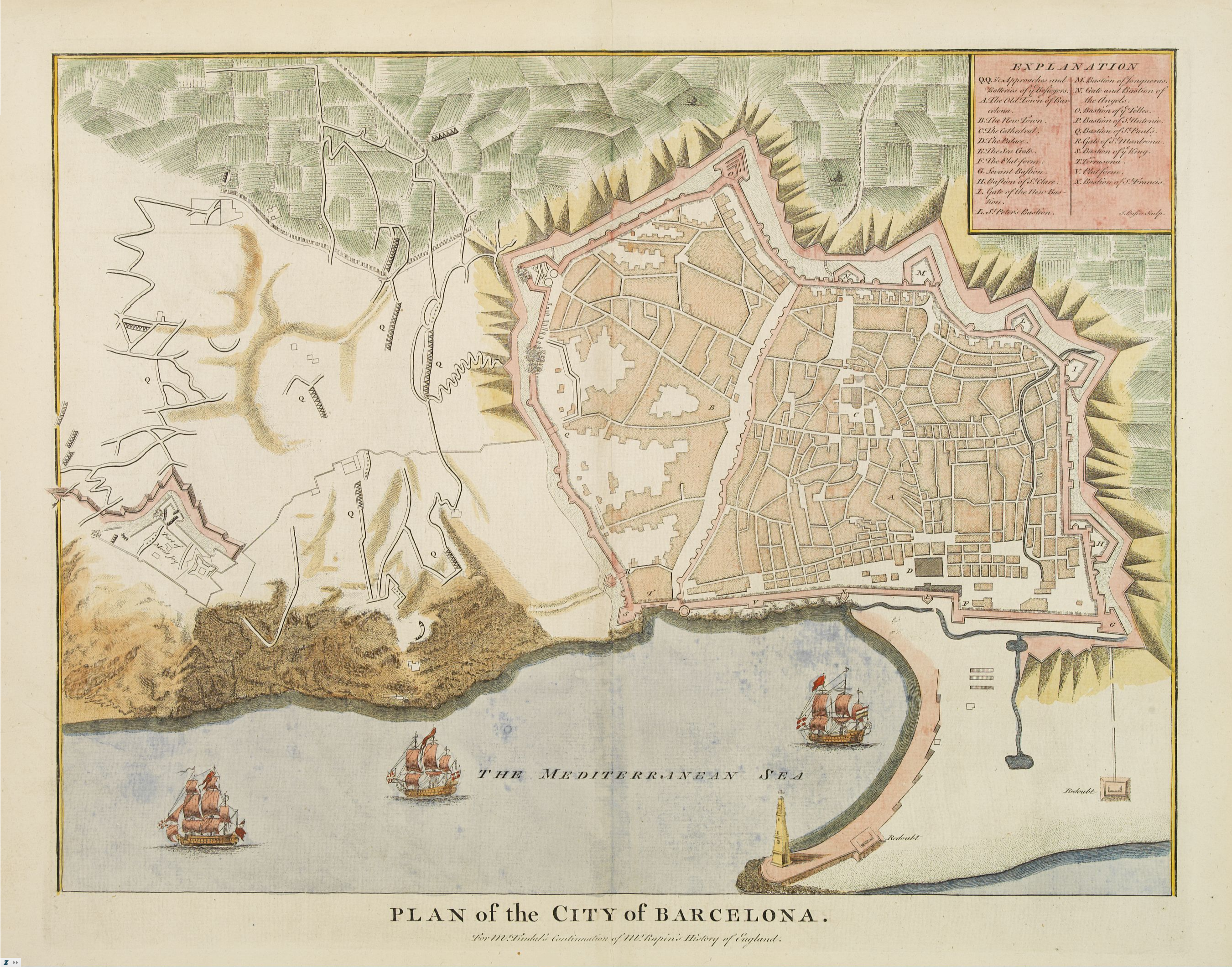
Barcelona around 1700, showing La Rambla running down the city center and flanked by the old city wall on its right.

The course of La Rambla was originally a sewage-filled stream, usually dry but an important drain for the heavy rainwater flowing from the Collserola hills during spring and autumn. (Rambla, from the Arabic رمل 'sand', is Catalan for "wadi". The name of the city of Ramla in Israel is derived from the same origin). It separated the walled city on its north-east bank from the settlements of El Raval ("the suburb") on its south-west.

In the year 1377, construction started on an extension of the city walls to include La Rambla and El Raval. In 1440, the stream was diverted to run outside the new walls, and La Rambla gradually started turning into a street.

Over the next few centuries, La Rambla became an established center of Barcelona's urban life, serving as a long wide thoroughfare used for festivals, markets, and sports. Several large religious establishments were also built along the street during this period. These include the Jesuit Bethlehem monastery and college (1553), of which just the later church remains; the Carmelite St. Joseph's monastery, on the site of the current Boqueria market; and a Capuchin monastery at the lower end of the street.

In 1703, the first of the trees lining La Rambla were planted. They were 280 birch trees and later on those were replaced by elm trees. In 1832, some acacias were planted and the currently standing plane trees started to be the common tree from 1859. During the late 19th century, many Catalans who had made their fortunes from trading in slaves or owning slave plantations in Spanish America returned to Barcelona after the abolition of slavery in 1886. Several of them invested their newfound fortunes in constructing opulent mansions in areas such as La Rambla. German historian Michael Zeuske has argued that the street was "built on the backs of slaves", although The Guardian claimed that "[this] is an exaggeration."

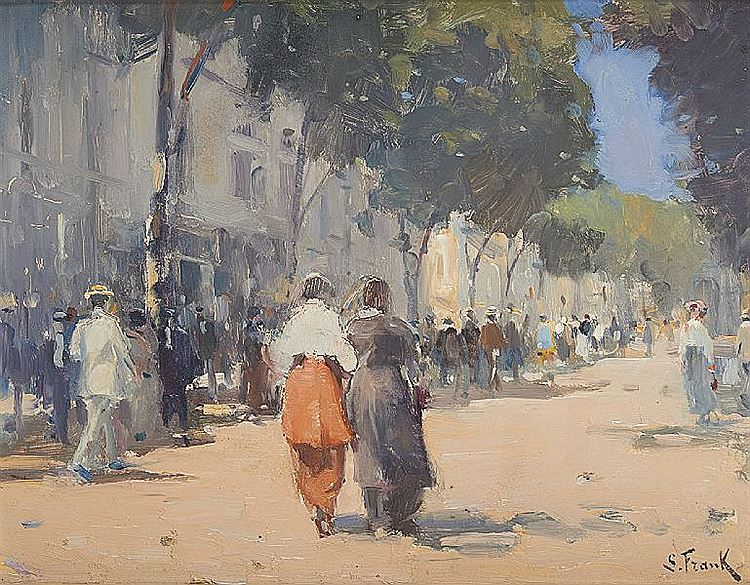
Lucien Frank, La Rambla à Barcelone, c. 1915–1917.

Various conflicts over recent centuries took their toll on La Rambla's religious buildings, most notably the St. James's Night riots in 1835, when revolutionaries burned the monasteries and churches and killed a number of friars; and the Spanish Civil War in 1936–39, when Barcelona came under the control of anarchists who again targeted religious buildings and personnel, as well as being damaged by artillery and air attacks on the area from pro-Franco forces.

Until 2010, the Rambla dels Estudis was the site of an open-air market for caged birds and other small pets. However animal protection laws made it difficult for the market to continue. After years of fighting the legislation, the market was forced to close.

On 17 August 2017, many people were struck by a van deliberately driven down the sidewalk on La Rambla in a terrorist attack, causing 16 deaths and at least 300 injuries.

== Sights ==
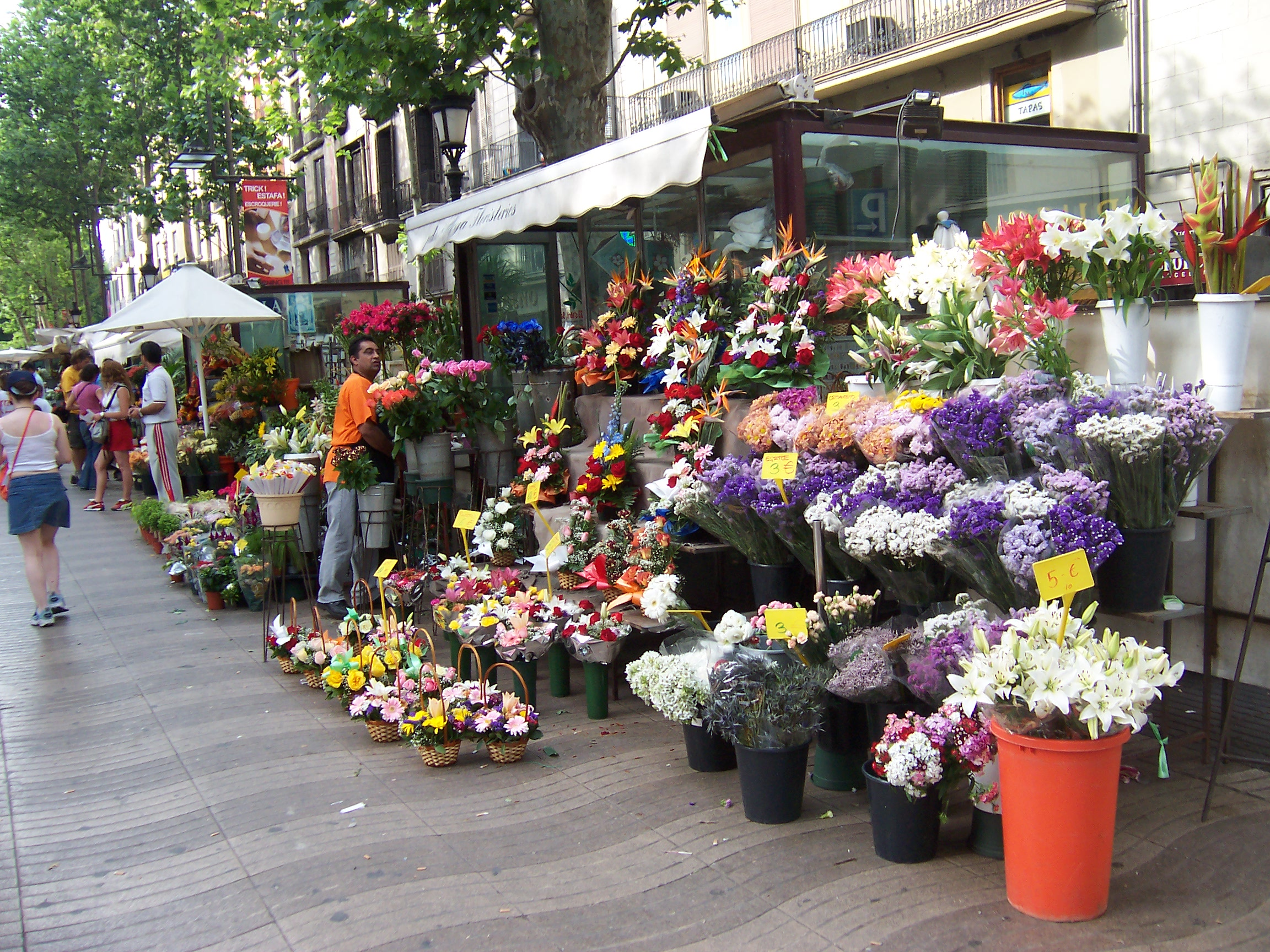
Flower shop on La Rambla

The tree-lined central promenade of La Rambla is crowded during the day and until late in the night. Its origins as a watercourse are reflected in the paving design, which appears to ripple like water. Along the promenade's length are kiosks that sell newspapers and souvenirs, other kiosks selling flowers, street traders, performers, and pavement cafes and bars. Several notable sights are also located within the promenade, including a mosaic by Joan Miró and the Font de Canaletes, a fountain and popular meeting point.

Along the Rambla are historic buildings such as the Palace of the Virreina and the Liceu Theater (Spanish: Liceo), in which operas and ballets are staged. The La Boqueria market opens off the Rambla and is one of the city's foremost tourist landmarks, housing a very diverse selection of goods.

One of the side streets, which is only a few meters long, leads to the Royal Square (Plaça Reial), a plaza with palm trees and porticoed buildings containing many pubs and restaurants, and where stamp and coin collectors gather on the weekends.

== Culture ==
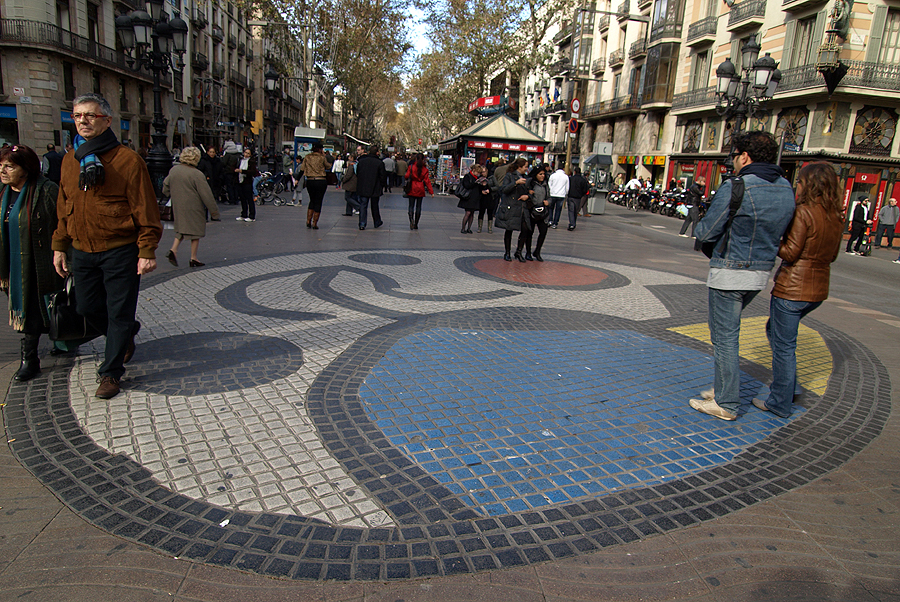
Pavement mosaic by Joan Miró on La Rambla

The Rambla is the location for several of Barcelona's cultural establishments, including:

- the Gran Teatre del Liceu, or simply Liceu, is Barcelona's opera house, opened in 1847.
- the Teatre Principal, is the oldest theater in Barcelona, founded in 1568, and subsequently rebuilt several times since.
- the Centre d'Art Santa Mònica is a public museum of contemporary art located on the Raval side of Rambla de Santa Mònica, with regular exhibitions of international artists.
- the Palau de la Virreina, a Baroque palace, hosts museum exhibitions and cultural events.

In the Pla de l'Os is a 1971 pavement mosaic by Joan Miró.

== Transport ==
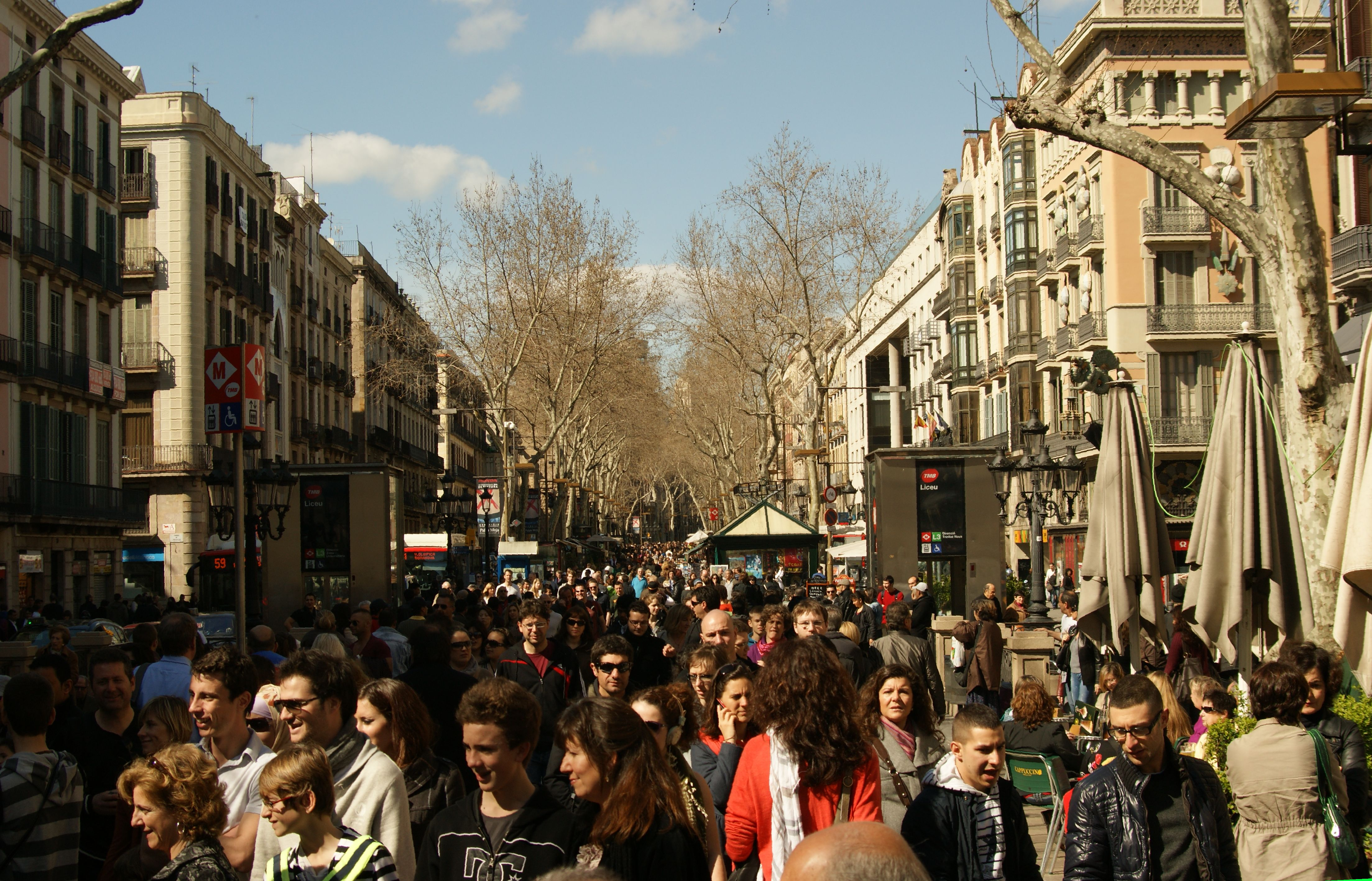
Pedestrian traffic and entrance to Liceu metro station

The most obvious transport mode on La Rambla is its heavy flow of pedestrians, who largely use the wide central pedestrianized area. This is flanked by two narrow service roads, which in turn are flanked by narrow pedestrian walkways in front of the buildings. Despite its length, no vehicular traffic is permitted to cross the central pedestrian walkway.

Line L3 of the Barcelona Metro runs beneath the length of La Rambla, with stations at:

- Catalunya, immediately adjacent to Plaça Catalunya, is a major interchange station served by several metro and suburban railway lines.
- Liceu, in front of the opera house Liceu, serves the central section of La Rambla.
- Drassanes is by the port next to Centre d'Art Santa Mònica.

Three Barcelona Bus lines operate along the service roads flanking La Rambla during the day (numbers 14, 59 and 91), whilst three different night time services also operate along La Rambla (numbers N9, N12 and N15).

== Redevelopment ==
In 2017 the city of Barcelona approved a plan to redevelop the famous street giving it a new image and function. Construction for the redevelopment is slated to begin in late 2022. The redevelopment budget is approximately €45 million and will be carried out in stages. More space will be made for pedestrians by reducing the number of car lanes. Traffic will also be restricted to use only by service vehicle and people who live in the area. The general idea is to create a "green space" that will be more welcoming to locals and tourists alike.

== See also ==
- Parks and gardens of Barcelona
- Street names in Barcelona
- Urban planning of Barcelona
