= Sant Pere =

Sant Pere (Catalan for Saint Peter) may refer to:

== Places ==
Catalonia

- Sant Pere, Santa Caterina i la Ribera, neighbourhood of Barcelona
  - Sant Pere de les Puelles, monastery in Sant Pere, Santa Caterina i la Ribera
  - Sant Pere, Barcelona, neighbourhood within Sant Pere, Santa Caterina i la Ribera
- Sant Pere de Besalú, monastery in Besalú
- Sant Pere de Camprodon, monastery in Camprodon
- Sant Pere de Galligants, monastery in Girona
- Sant Pere de Graudescales, monastery in Navès
- Sant Pere de les Maleses, church in La Pobla de Segur
- Sant Pere Pescador, town in Alt Empordà
- Sant Pere de la Portella, monastery in La Quar
- Sant Pere de Riudebitlles, village in Alt Penedès
- Sant Pere de Ribes, town in Garraf
- Sant Pere de Rodes, monastery in El Port de la Selva
- Sant Pere Sallavinera, village in Anoia
- Sant Pere de Torelló, town in Osona
- Sant Pere de Vilamajor, village in Vallès Oriental

Other

- Sant Pere, Andorra
- Colònia de Sant Pere, in Mallorca
- Sant Pere d'Albaida, or Sempere, in Valencia province
- Serra de Sant Pere, mountain range in the Valencian Community
