= Mercat del Born =

Former public market in Barcelona

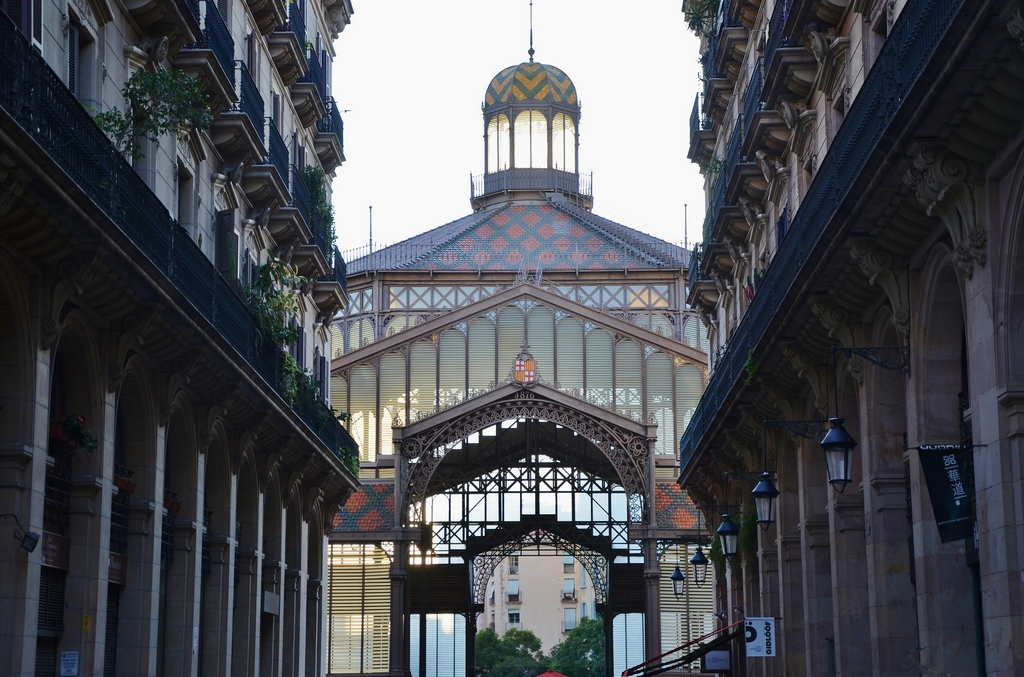
- Mercat del Born seen from Passatge de Mercantil
- Interactive map of the Mercat del Born area

General information
- Status: Under renovation
- Type: Modernisme
- Location: La Ribera (Barcelona)
- Coordinates: 41°23′7.43″N 2°11′2.76″E
- Construction started: 1873
- Opening: 1878
- Owner: Ajuntament de Barcelona

Technical details
- Floor area: 8,000 m^{2} (86,111 sq ft)

Design and construction
- Architect: Antoni Rovira i Trias
- Developer: Josep Fontserè i Mestre
- Structural engineer: Josep Cornet i Mas

Mercat del Born is a former public market and one of the most important buildings in Barcelona, Catalonia, Spain constructed with iron. Located in the lower and eastern side of the la Ribera neighborhood, it is the largest covered square in all of Europe and marked the start of Modernisme in Catalan architecture.

== Design ==
The market is rectangular, with two large domed, intersecting buildings, and 4 smaller naves. The structure is supported on cast iron columns with a flat roof covered in glazed tile.

== History ==
The market was designed in 1873 by the municipal architect Antoni Rovira i Trias (who also designed the Mercat de Sant Antoni) and built between 1874 and 1878 by master builder Josep Fontserè i Mestre and engineer Josep Maria Cornet i Mas. The structure of cast iron columns and metallic horses was fabricated by La Maquinista Terrestre i Marítima.

The market came into operation in 1878 and was in use as the central market in town until 1971. At its closure, it was functioning as a wholesale market, but was replaced with the opening of Mercabarna in Zona Franca.

== Born "District" ==
In recent years, the area immediately surrounding the market has been referred to as "el Born" or the Castilian variant "el Borne". A heavily gentrified area considered to be south of Carrer de la Princesa, it is full of restaurants, bars, and some small shops with many expatriates both living and socializing there. Despite this colloquial name given to the area (which is often applied to the entire district), it is still officially called la Ribera or Sant Pere, Santa Caterina i la Ribera.

== Restoration ==
Restoration work started and stopped several times since the closure of market. Each successive city government had a different plan for the very large space. At some points, there were even plans to lease it to a retail establishment such as FNAC who had expressed interest.

After closure, it fell into a state of disrepair and was restored 1977 to 1981 under the direction of Pere Espinosa.

In 2002 work was started to install the Biblioteca Provincial de Barcelona, but during excavations, extensive ruins of the medieval city were discovered. It was then decided to preserve the ruins and move the library project to another location.

Currently, the market covers these archaeological ruins which were part of the la Ribera district that was demolished in the early eighteenth century after the defeat of Catalonia in the War of Succession in 1714. This portion of la Ribera was forcibly demolished to make way for the construction of the Ciutadella military structure as ordered by the new Spanish king, Philip V.

The plan that finally came to fruition in 2013 was to expose the subterranean ruins for visitors while preserving space around the exterior of them for mixed use, cultural center, in addition to having a museum about the War of Succession onsite. At the same time, it is now possible for pedestrians to pass freely from Passeig del Born through to the other side that leads to the park of Ciutadella.

The official inauguration of the restored market was September 11, 2013.

The transformation of the old market into a museum space was led by the study of Varis Arquitectes and executed by the UTE between Sapic, Croquis and Sono Audiovisual Technology. The project of integrated audiovisual systems includes both the exhibition spaces and other rooms and auditoriums of the center. In addition to various display media, such as projection and videowall, the center is equipped with simultaneous translation equipment and a control system to govern all elements.

== See also ==
- Rec Comtal
- Fountain of Sant Agustí Vell
- Convent of Sant Agustí Vell
