= Pep Bertran =

Catalan writer

- Born: November 20, 1971 (age 54)
- Occupation: Writer
- Writing career
- Notable awards: Premi Just Manuel Casero

Pep Bertran (born in Mataró, Maresme, 20 September 1971) is a Catalan writer. He studied information science, psychoanalysis and film direction. In 1996 he received the Premi de novel·la curta Just Manuel Casero Award for his novel La Ribera, which was published in 1997 by Empúries publishing house. Then, he left the writing and he was trained as a psychoanalyst. He collaborated on El Punt newspaper between 1997 and 1998. His novel Una vida regalada, the first of the "Narratives" collection (Edicions Saldonar) is a fake autobiography of author whose scenario is La Ribera of Barcelona.

== Published work ==
This is a collection of his literary:

- La Ribera. Barcelona: Editorial Empúries, 1997.
- L'autor i la histèrica Girona: Ed. Senhal, 1998.
- Una vida regalada - Les falses memòries d'un aprenent d'escriptor. Barcelona: Edicions Saldonar, 2012. ISBN 978-84-937800-6-7
- Entre dues llums - Èdip a la rectoria. Barcelona: Edicions Saldonar, 2013. ISBN 978-84-941164-3-8

== Awards ==
- 1996: Premi Just Manuel Casero
