= La Ribera =

Coordinates: 41°23′01″N 2°10′59″E

- Former and traditional neighborhood of Barcelona
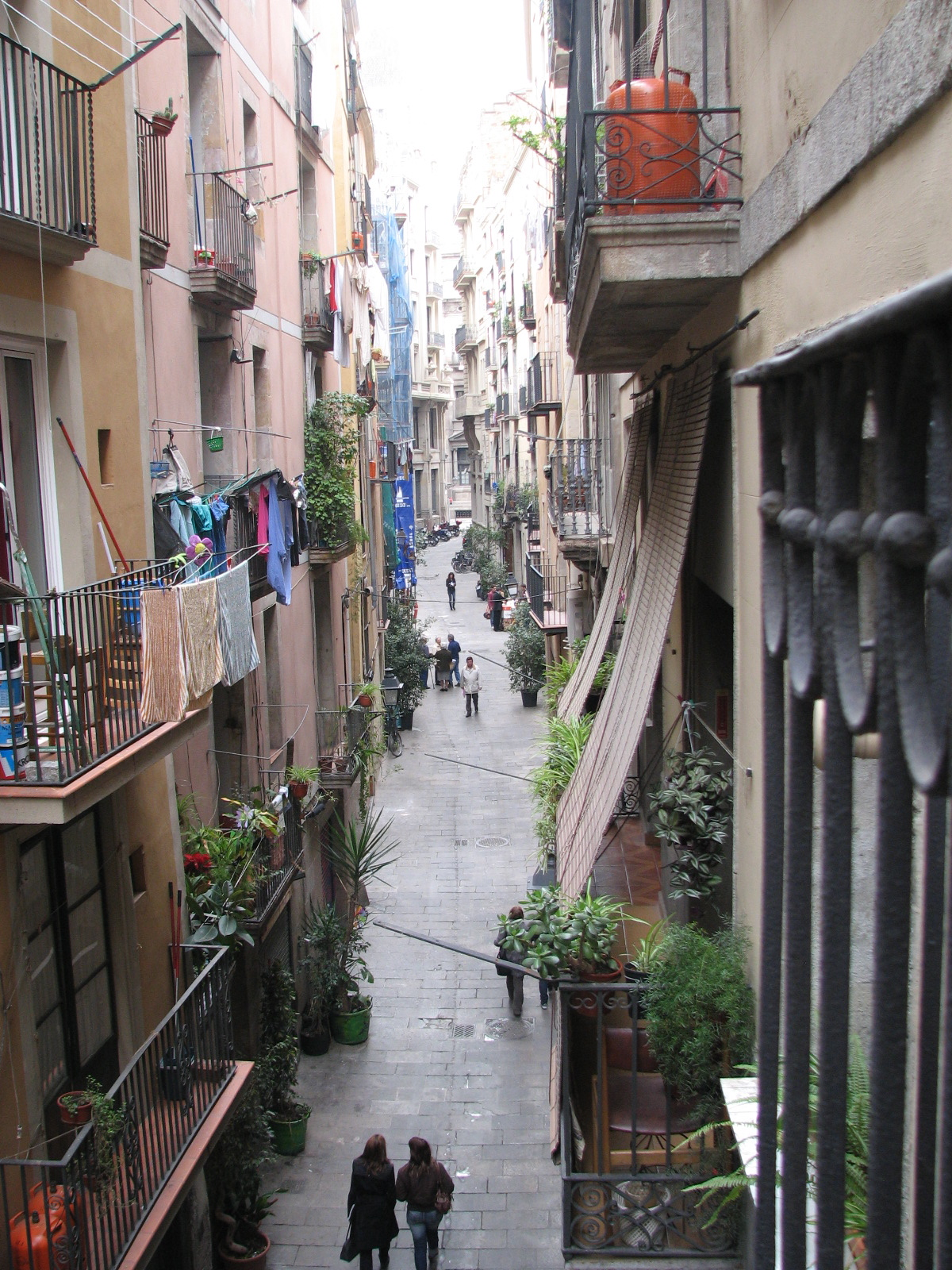
- Carrer dels Agullers, a typical narrow street view in la Ribera

- Map of Sant Pere, Santa Caterina i la Ribera within Barcelona
- Country: Spain
- Autonomous Community: Catalonia
- Province: Barcelona
- Comarca: Barcelonès
- Municipality: Barcelona
- District: Ciutat Vella
- Neighborhood: Sant Pere, Santa Caterina i la Ribera
- Postal code: 08003

La Ribera (Catalan pronunciation: [lə riˈβeɾə], 'The Shore') is one of the areas of the quarter of Sant Pere, Santa Caterina i la Ribera of Ciutat Vella ("the old city") of Barcelona.

== Overview ==
Many of the buildings date from late Medieval times. It was a well-to-do quarter during 13th–15th centuries, when it really was by the sea shore, and the area that today is named Barceloneta was still an island. Notable buildings are the Basilica de Santa Maria del Mar and the palaces along Carrer de Montcada, including the Museu Picasso, the Museu Barbier-Mueller d'Art Precolombí, and part of the Textile Museum.

The former market hall Mercat del Born covers archaeological ruins which were part of the La Ribera district that was demolished after the Siege of Barcelona (1713–14) and the defeat of Catalonia in the War of Succession. Another place of interest is the Fossar de les Moreres, the site of a mass grave of Catalan soldiers fallen during the siege of 1714. Part of the quarter of La Ribera was demolished after 1714 to build a military citadel to punish the defeated city.

The lower section of the La Ribera district, just below Carrer de la Princesa, and leading to Barceloneta is referred to as El Born after the 19th century market on carrer del Comerç that dominates the area. This is one of the trendiest and most touristic districts in the old city. It is a popular place for expats and contains many art boutiques, bars and cafés.

The northernmost part of the quarter, La Ribera proper and Sant Pere, in contrast to El Born, is not frequented by tourists so much, even though it is between Arc de Triomf and Via Laietana, and actually constitutes a much poorer area with a larger number of migrant workers. It is being revitalised, but as with many other instances of urban development in Barcelona, the process has been ethically contested. The Forat de la Vergonya area, near Santa Eulàlia Cathedral, is such an example. The Biblioteca Francesca Bonnemaison is a cultural institution of the neighbourhood.

== Gallery ==
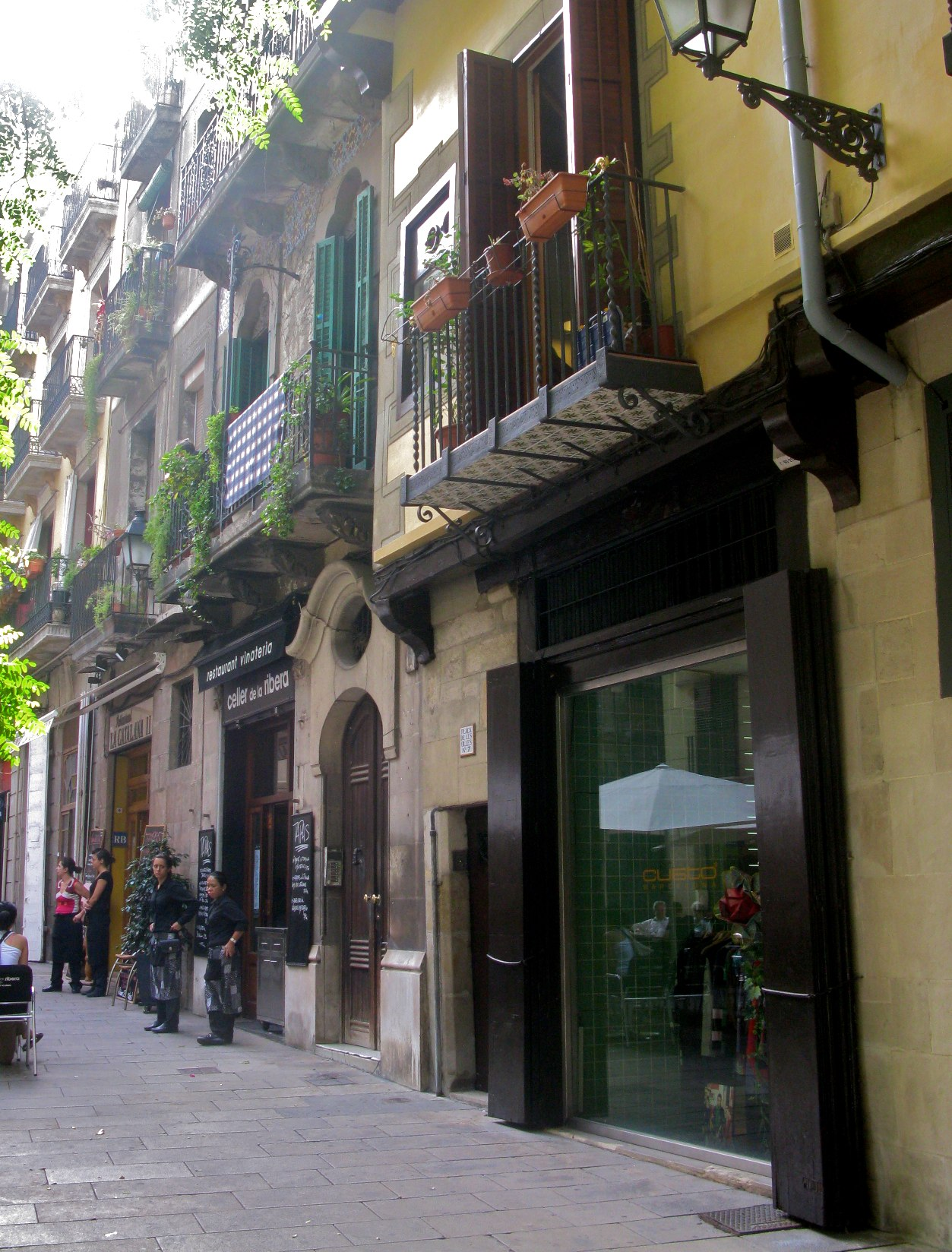
Plaça de les Olles

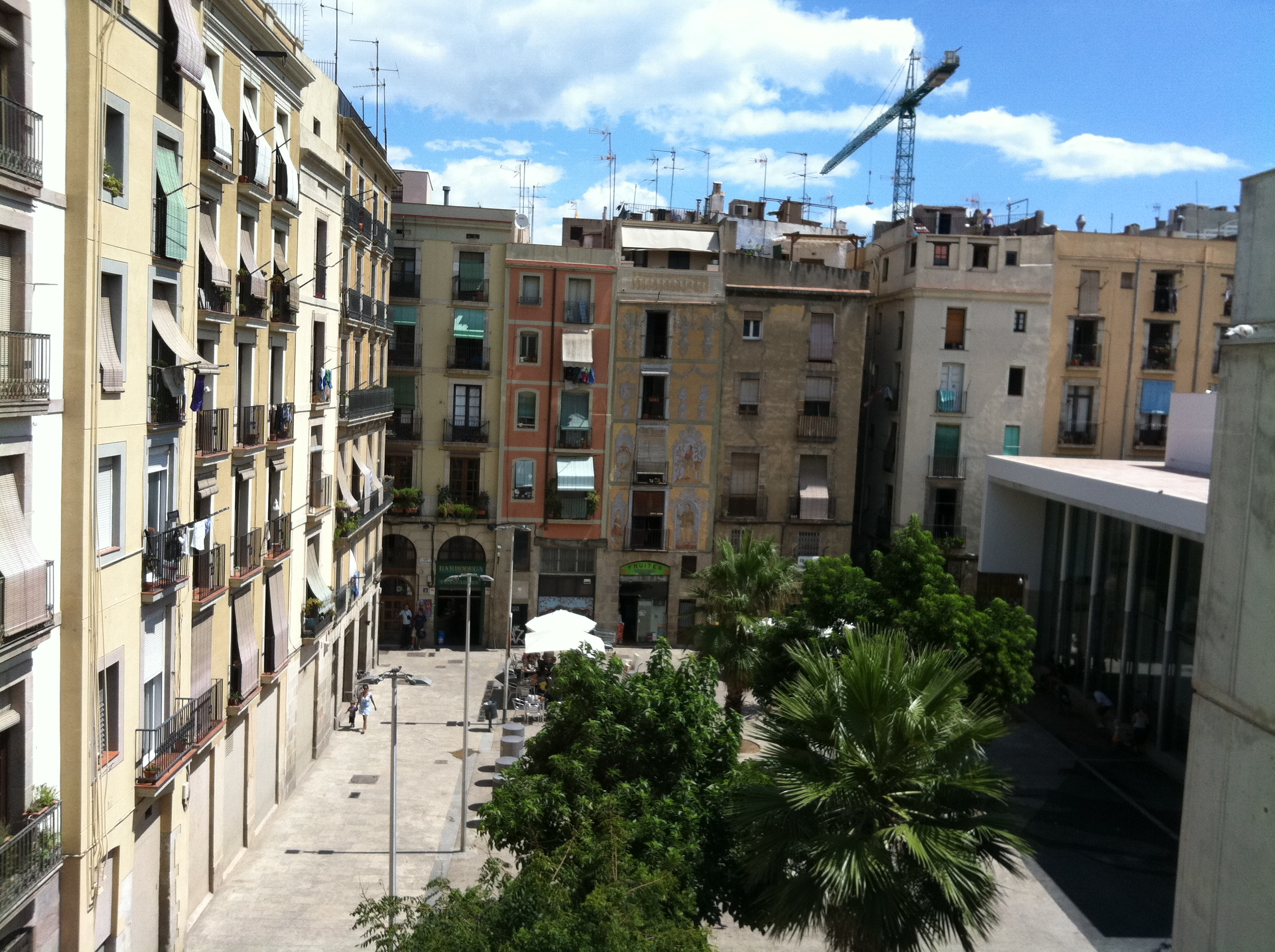
Plaça Sabatés

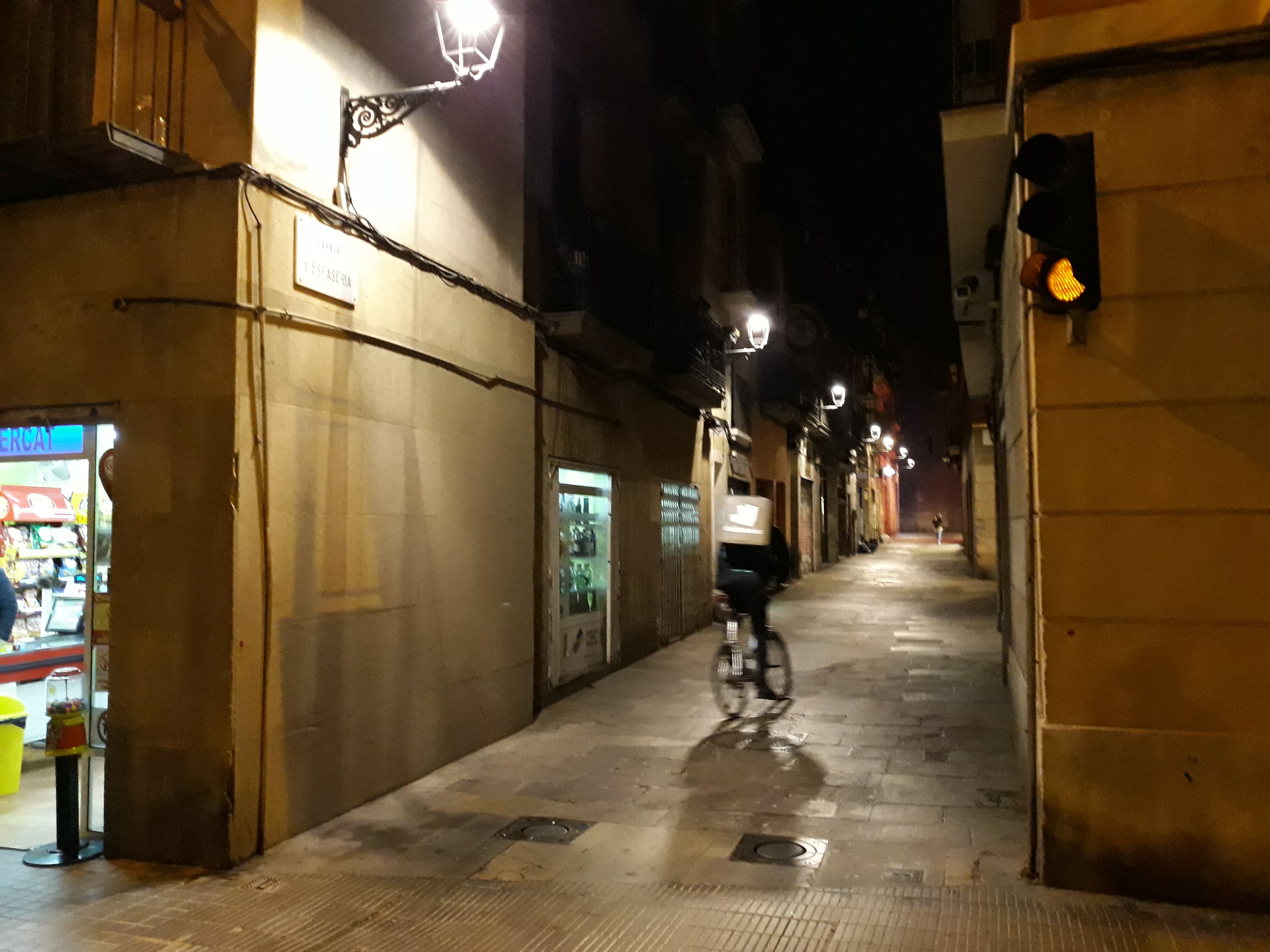
Carrer d'Espaseria

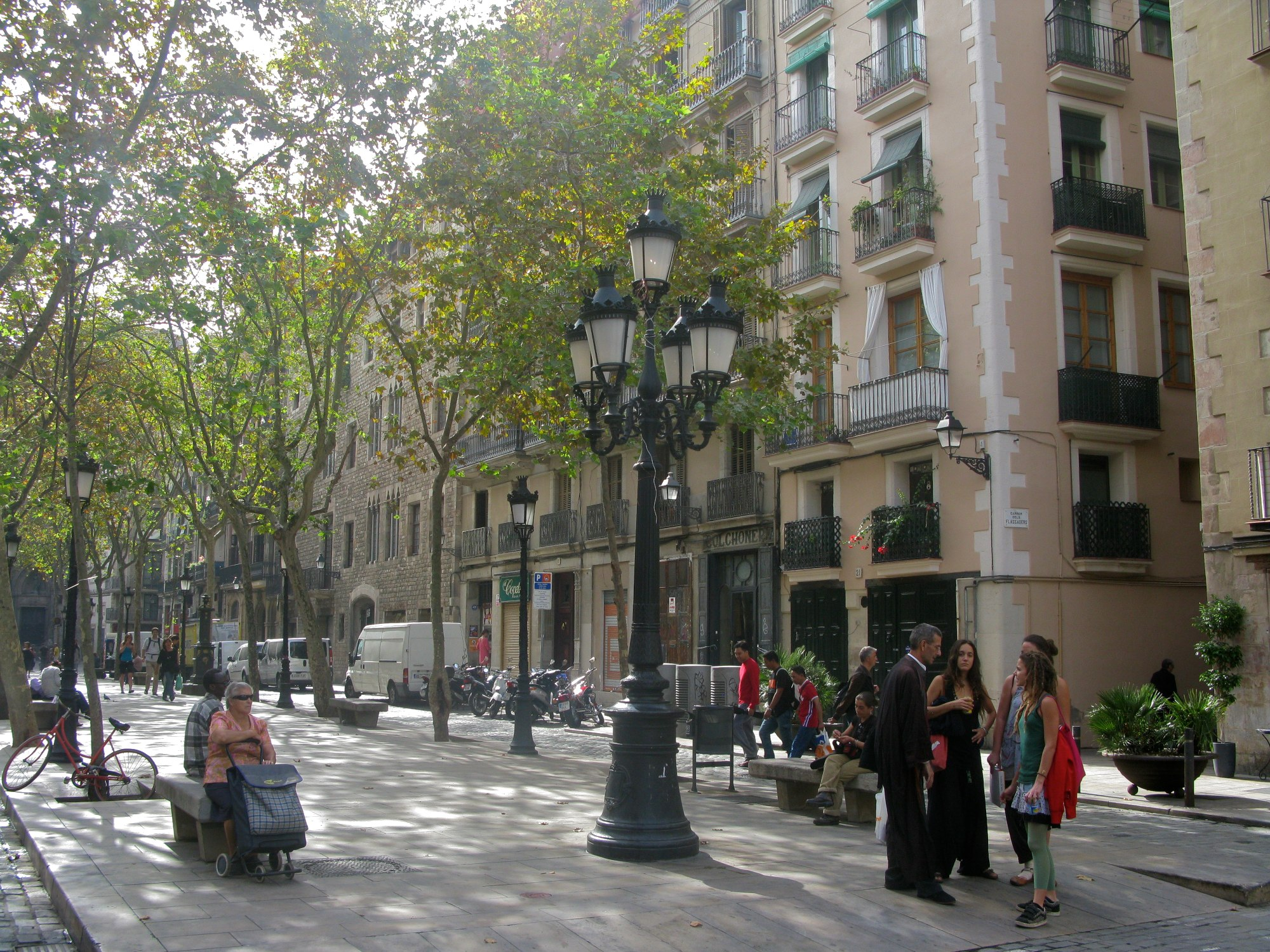
Passeig del Born

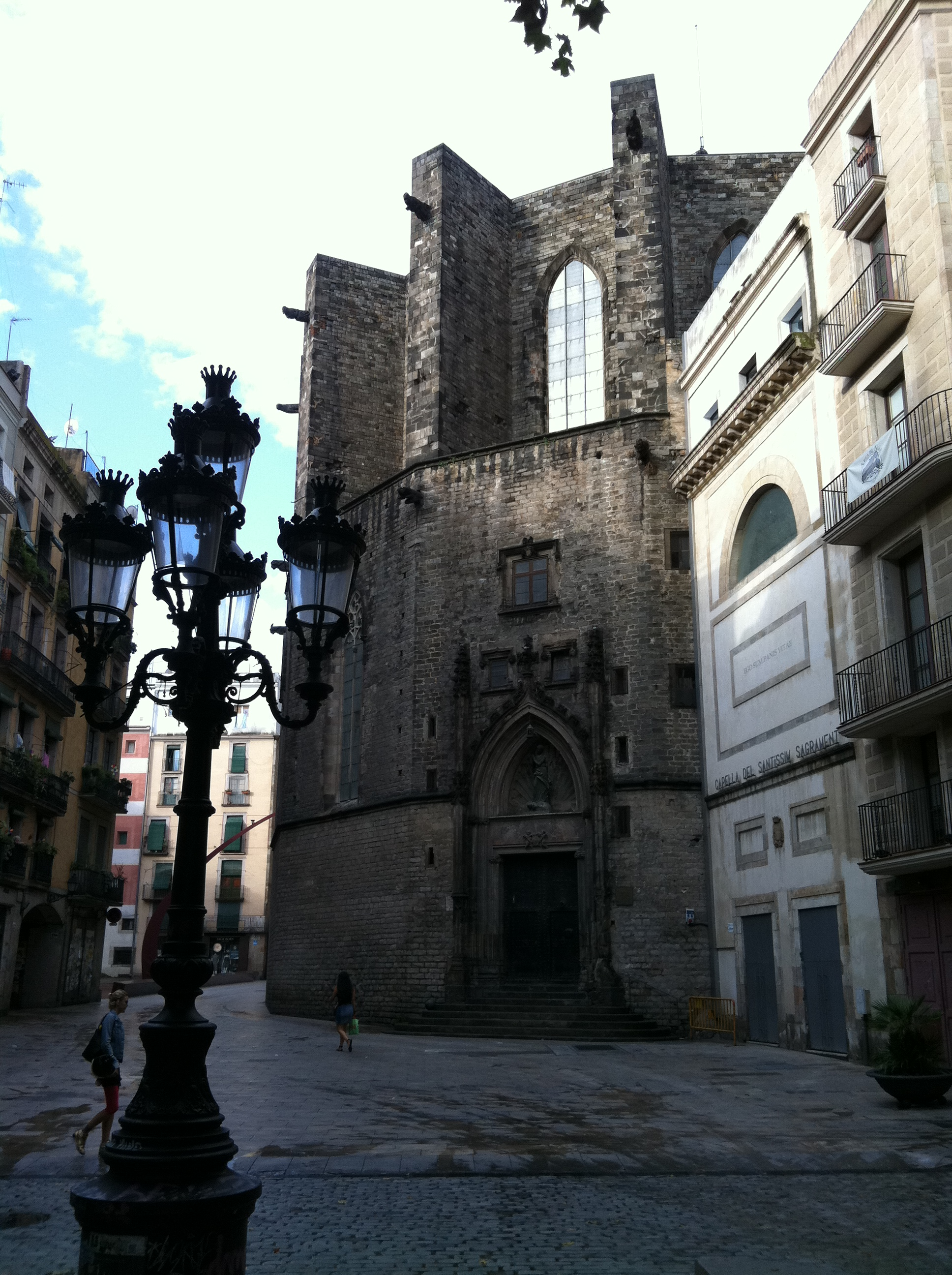
Basilica de Santa Maria del Mar

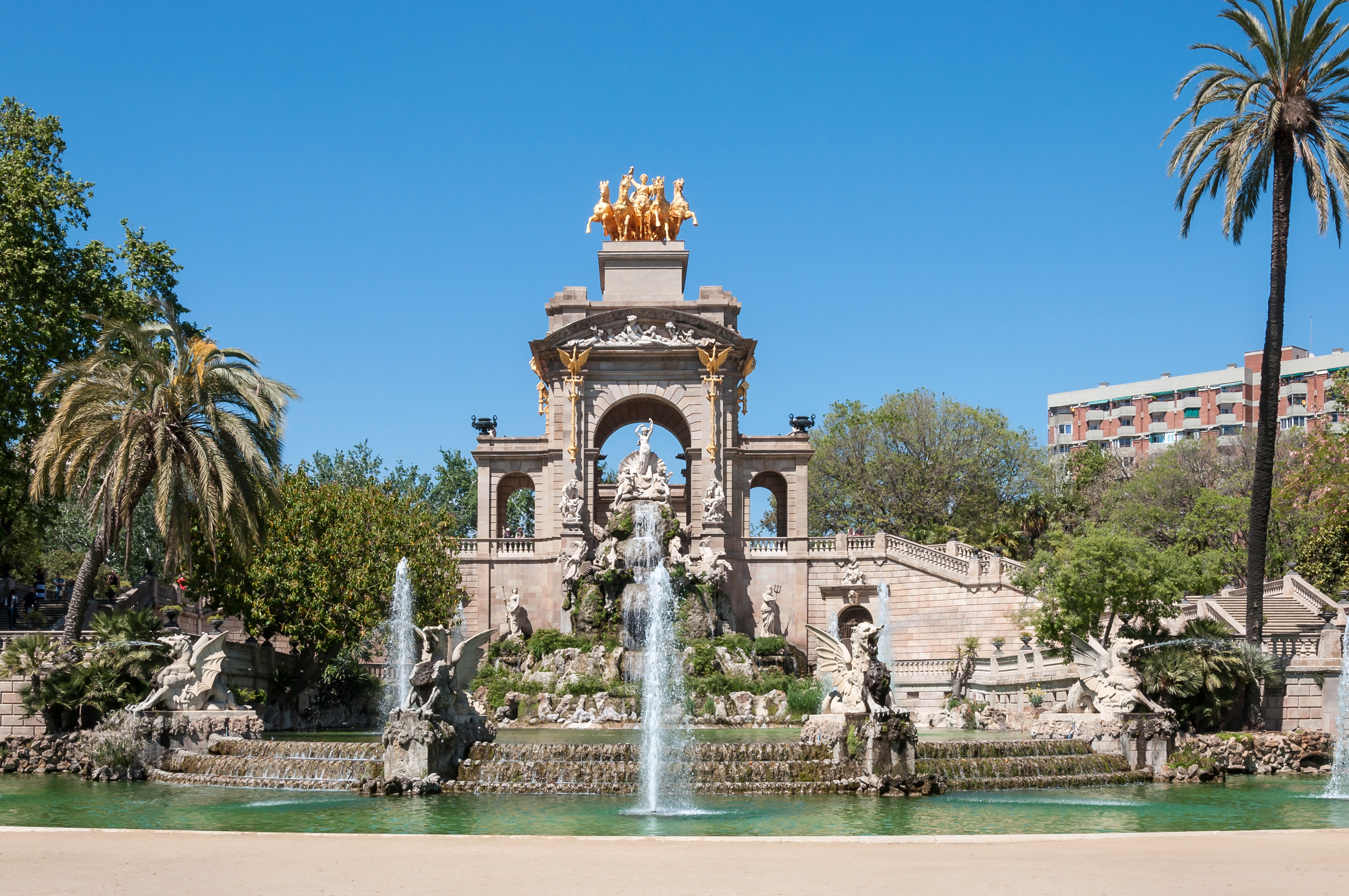
Parc de la Ciutadella

== See also ==
- Parc de la Ciutadella
- Museu Picasso
