= Rec Comtal =

Coordinates: 41°23′23″N 2°10′47″E

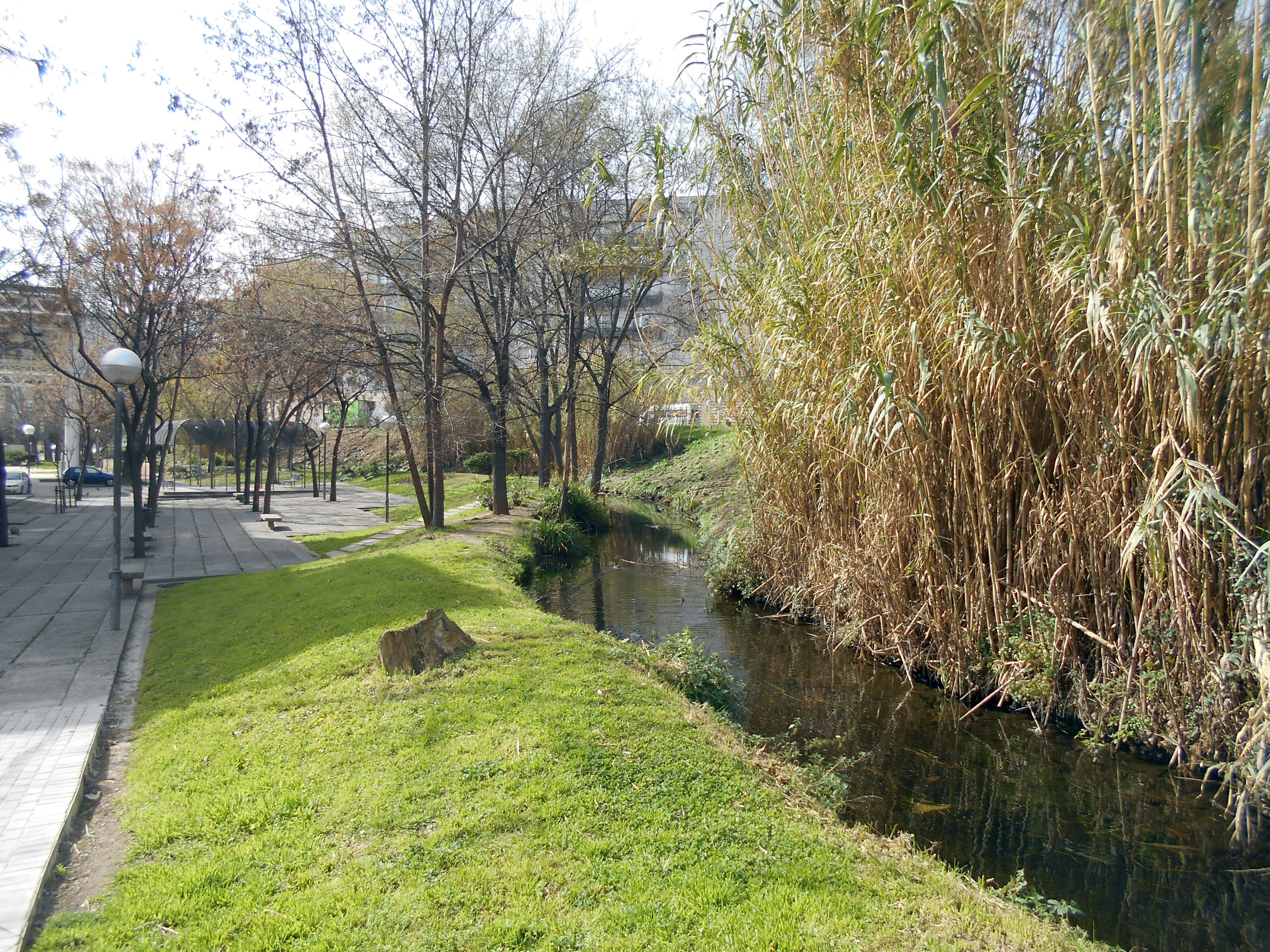

The Rec Comtal of Barcelona was a hydraulic structure of first magnitude that was an irrigation canal until the 19th century being one of the main water supplies of the city, which was used for irrigation and also as hydraulic force to operate the various mills built along its route. It transported water from the Besòs river to the walls of the city. Its construction was begun by Miro, Count of Barcelona in the 10th century, but it may date back to Roman times. It supplied water until the mid-20th century. In March 2016, extensive remains of structures associated with the system were discovered during excavations at Plaça de les Glòries Catalanes, and is a work protected as a Cultural Property of Local Interest.

The irrigation system started at the Pous de Montcada, replacing the old Roman aqueduct in Barcelona. The remains of Rec Comtal, on its way through the Sant Andreu district, are located on undeveloped land between Carrer Fernando Pessoa and the platform of the Station, next to Carrer Palomar. These remains are completely covered by vegetation. The only visible element is a lowered arch bridge over the Rec canal made of irregular stone joined with mortar and brick at the top and in the arch. Only one side of the bridge is preserved. In 2004, an archaeological excavation was carried out where the remains of a section of a Roman aqueduct and structures of a medieval mill came to light, but none of this is currently visible due to the construction of a school-workshop on the lot where they were located.

== History ==
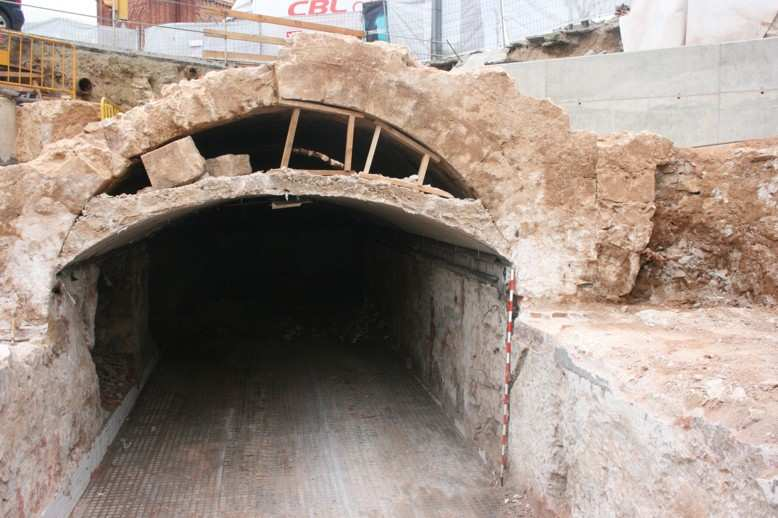
Rec Comtal, Arc de Triomf, 2009

As an antecedent of this canal there was a Roman aqueduct, the aqueduct of Montcada, which fell into disuse from the High Middle Ages. The construction of the Rec dates back to the 10th century and was possibly commissioned by Count Mir to boost the industry that was beginning to be established around Barcelona. It had a route of more than 12 km: it was born in a lock near Montcada and flowed into the port via Pla de Palau . Along its route, it irrigated numerous orchards in Sant Andreu de Palomar, Sant Martí de Provençals, the Portal Nou orchards, Sant Pere and the Favà orchards. It was not until 1703 that the canal was used as a water supply for the city and it was used until the 19th century At the point where these remains are found was the mill of Sant Andreu (mill of the Torre de Bell-lloc ), built in the 13th century, which was the last of the mills to disappear in Sant Andreu.

It is difficult, even now, to locate exactly the beginning of the construction of the Rec Comtal. There are several hypotheses, the most widespread of which tells us that it was the work of Count Mir (954-966), the younger brother of Count Borrell II of Barcelona, at the beginning of the second half of the 10th century

It will be throughout the 11th century when the use of the Rec is generalized, especially from the second half, as is reflected in the documentation. The mills that are supplied from the Rec begin to proliferate, from the area of Sant Andreu, specifically Finestrelles, towards the Clot and within the current Ciutat Vella, around the monastery of Sant Pere de les Puelles, in the neighborhoods of Portal Nou and Sant Pere - Santa Caterina .

What is clear is that you cannot separate the processes of the construction of the Rec, with the disuse of the Roman aqueduct, since we cannot speak of its disappearance.

The Rec is the protagonist of a large number of studies, but we lack one that embraces both morphological and diachronic and territorial research. There are three basic sources for undertaking its study: physical evidence - what remains or what has been documented in archaeological interventions -, historiographical documents or writings and, finally, graphic representations - both planimetric and photographic -. The information extracted from each one is diverse, but at the same time complementary, and helps to reconstruct part of the layout and morphology.

== Morphology ==
We do not know what the primitive Rec would look like, given that throughout the millennium of its existence it has undergone several remodelings. What can be said is that it was a large open-air canal, with a width that varied according to the layout. The walls were of Montjuïc stone ashlars, joined with lime mortar, with a base of natural earth, without any special coating. Along the route there were bridges, mostly stone, but there could be wooden ones, which facilitated the crossing. Through archeology it has been possible to document that the Rec was cleaned with some regularity, which means that no materials from the first moment of construction are preserved.

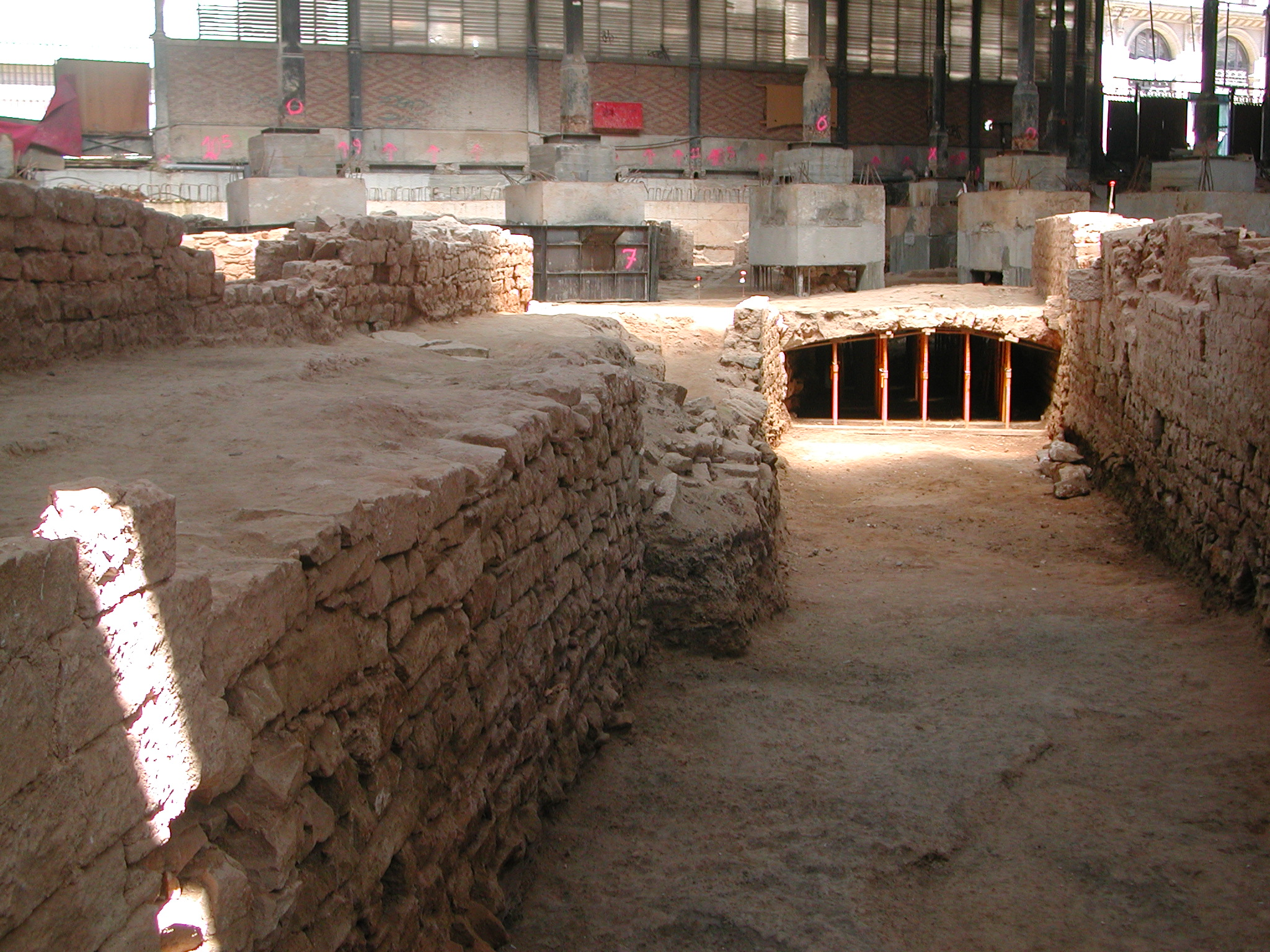
Section of Rec Comtal at Mercat del Born

Where the most changes occurred in relation to the shape and layout of the Rec was within the city, where it functioned as a street - canal, becoming a partially covered structure, and often with large bridges such as the which can be seen inside the Born. Mention on the side is the great remodeling that the Rec underwent following the construction of the Ciutadella, which brought about a major change both in the Rec and its mouth to the sea.

One of the features that defines the Rec is that it is a large open-air canal, with a large flow of water, which was done to be able to operate the mills that were built around it. The construction of mills went on increasing, until the 13th century a total of twenty-one flour mills are known along the Rec. This one did not only run mills, in the area of Sant Andreu, in the 12th century, a forge was also built there, which was the property of the Canon and its function was to repair the field tools of all the farmers in more than half of the plan of Barcelona. This forge must have been found, approximately, in the area where the Rec meets the so-called Riera d'Horta, and it worked with the hydraulic energy of the Rec.

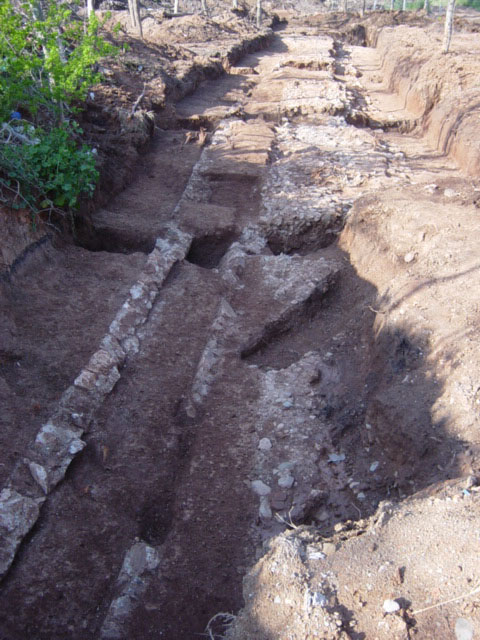
Remains of the Roman aqueduct in Sant Andreu, 2004

The mills that operated with Rec water were not only millers, as there were also drapers, which increased throughout the life of the canal. The Rec, however, also served as an irrigation system, as its name indicates, since it operated a whole system of ditches along its route. The land near the county town was at one point known as the "orchard and vineyard", a name that comes from the crops that were around the town. In order to have a good vegetable garden you need constant watering.

== Course ==
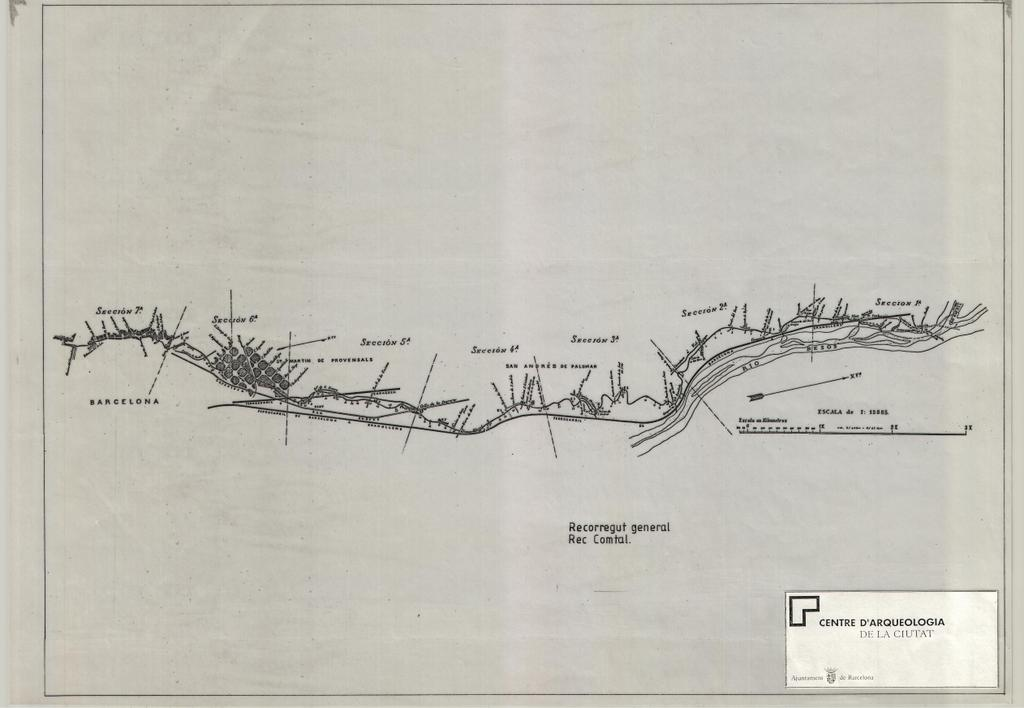
General tour of the Rec Comtal, Archeology Service, ICUB

The Rec is born in the place known as Montcada wells, very similar to the origin of the Roman aqueduct. However, in the area of the Molí de Sant Andreu the route of the Rec clearly diverges from that of the Roman aqueduct, because the Rec is located perpendicular to the slope as it passes through the mill while the aqueduct, documented archaeologically, continues with a markedly straight line parallel to the slope.

Likewise, very close to the current intersection of Carrer de Roger de Flor and Carrer d'Ausiàs March, the Rec Comtal turns sharply to the southeast, perpendicular to the slope, in the direction of Molí del Clot located about 150 meters down slope. At another point, the Rec turns sharply to the south, perpendicular to the slope, in the direction of the Dormidor or gunpowder mill, while the Roman aqueduct maintains a more gradual descent, adapting to the documentary evidence as it passes between the path of Sant Adrià and the path of Horta, and continues following the slope until it fits with the pillar of Magdalenes 25.

These changes in the trajectory of the Rec were probably useful for its use by the various mill installations, since they would allow the water to descend with greater energy and, therefore, be better used by the mill.

As for the Rec Comtal, its main function was not to bring drinking water to the city, because in medieval times most of the water for drinking in the city was obtained through wells, in Barcelona there is a large amount of 'good quality ground water, which has been used throughout history. The fundamental purpose of the Rec was to move the mills located along the route, to irrigate the land, to supply new productive areas with a great need for water, such as butchers, or tanneries, etc. and, perhaps in the last term and certainly in a small amount, mouth watering.

== See also ==
- Urban planning of Barcelona
- Font del gat (Rec Comtal)
- Convent of Sant Agustí Vell

== Bibliography ==
- Guàrdia, Manuel (ed.). La Revolució de l'aigua a Barcelona: de la ciutat preindustrial a la metròpoli moderna, 1867-1967. Barcelona: Institut de Cultura, Muhba, 2011. ISBN 9788498503654
- MARTÍN PASCUAL, Manel (1999): El Rec Comtal, 1822-1879. La lluita per l'aigua a del 19th century, Barcelona, Fundació Salvador Vives i Casajuana, Editorial Rafael Dalmau. ISBN 84-232-0599-1
