= Convent of Sant Agustí Vell =

Convent in Barcelona, Spain

Coordinates: 41.3876°N 2.1814°E

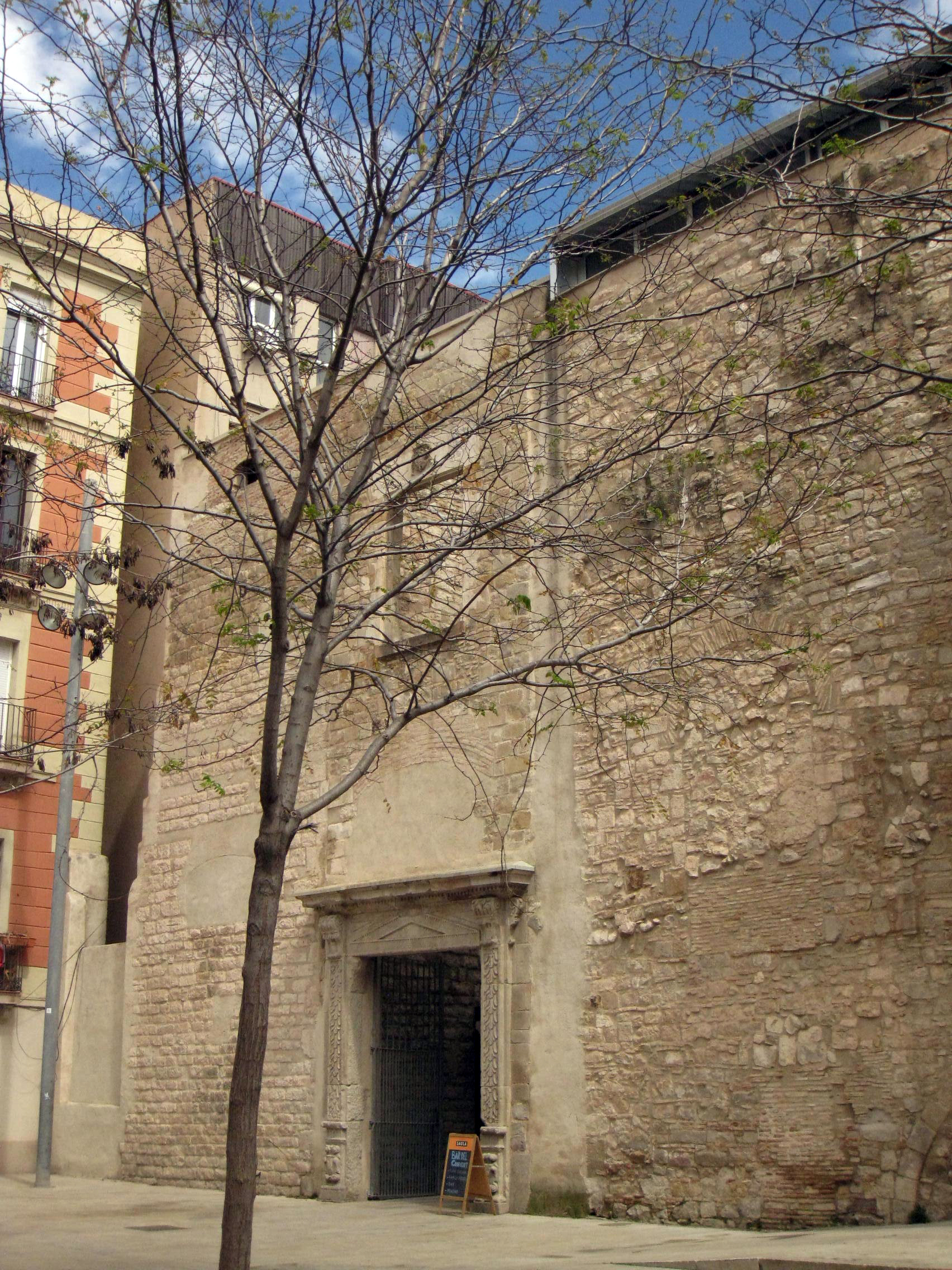

The Convent of Sant Agustí Vell is a convent in the Ribera district of Barcelona which construction began in 1349 and was completed around 1506. It was located in the area where artisan tanners dedicated to the treatment of skins, used to work, an activity that requires a high consumption of water, reason why it was located around the Rec Comtal, routed through Carrer del Rec and the current location of the Mercat del Born.

== History ==
The church was destroyed in 1716, for is active collaboration in the resistance against Phillip V, and the Augustinian order moved to the Church of Sant Agustí, inaugurated in 1750, leaving room for the Plaça de Sant Agustí Vell. To know the morphology of the disappeared church, it can be compared with the Church of San Juan Bautista in Valls, since in 1569 it was decided to take the church of San Agustín as a reference. Thus, the church should measure just over 58 meters long by almost 15 meters wide, in addition to the side chapels, and the height would be close to 25 meters.

In the context of the social and economic crisis that characterized the end of the Late Middle Ages, the sensation of vital provisionality of society led to a deep religious feeling and the need to develop solidarity structures where to find physical, professional and, finally, spiritual security. In this context, with a demographic crisis as a consequence of the wars and the plague that devastated Catalonia, individualism had no reason to exist and the guilds and brotherhoods provided a degree of security in a changing environment and became powerful organizations that made up a political power in uniting a group of society in full evolution. Having its own chapel inside a church and its decoration with an altarpiece, were the maximum material representation of its values.

The Guild of Tanners had a brotherhood founded in the early fifteenth century. Its ordinances were approved by King Martí l'Humà, in Segorbe, on October 18, 1401, at the request of the leading men of the tanners, and were confirmed in Barcelona on June 23, 1405. According to these, the tanners venerated Saint Augustine as their patron and had their own chapel in the convent since 1401.

It is the headquarters of the Photographic Archive of Barcelona and the Chocolate Museum .

Following the confiscation of the convents in 1835, the CRAI Reserve Library of the University of Barcelona preserves the collections from the Convent of Sant Agustí, which currently number almost a thousand editions. Likewise, he has registered and described some examples of the property marks that identified the convent throughout its existence.

== See also ==
- Fountain of Sant Agustí Vell
- Anti-clerical riots of 1835

== Bibliography ==
- Artís Tomàs, Andreu-Avel·lí (Sempronio) (1972). 100 fuentes de Barcelona. Barcelona: Sociedad General de Aguas de Barna.
- Cesàreo, Pere (1986). Barcelona art i aigua : Fonts públiques i ornamentals. Barcelona: Aldina. ISBN 84-86627-001.
- Martín Pascual, Manel (2009). Barcelona: aigua i ciutat. L'abastament d'aigua entre les dues Exposicions (1888-1929). Barcelona: Marcial Pons. ISBN 978-84-9768-671-6.
- Riutort, Josep Maria (1946). Historia y leyenda de las fuentes urbanas y campestres de Barcelona. Barcelona: Millà.
- Vázquez Montalbán, Manuel (1990). Barcelona fuente a fuente. Madrid: Repsol. ISBN 84-7368-107-X.
- Massot i Muntaner, Josep. History compendium of the hermits of our father Saint Augustine, of the Principality of Catalonia: from the years of 394 when Saint Paulinus began to plant monasteries... until the years of 1699 (in Spanish). in the Juan Jolis printing house, 1699 [Accessed: August 17, 2011].

== Gallery ==
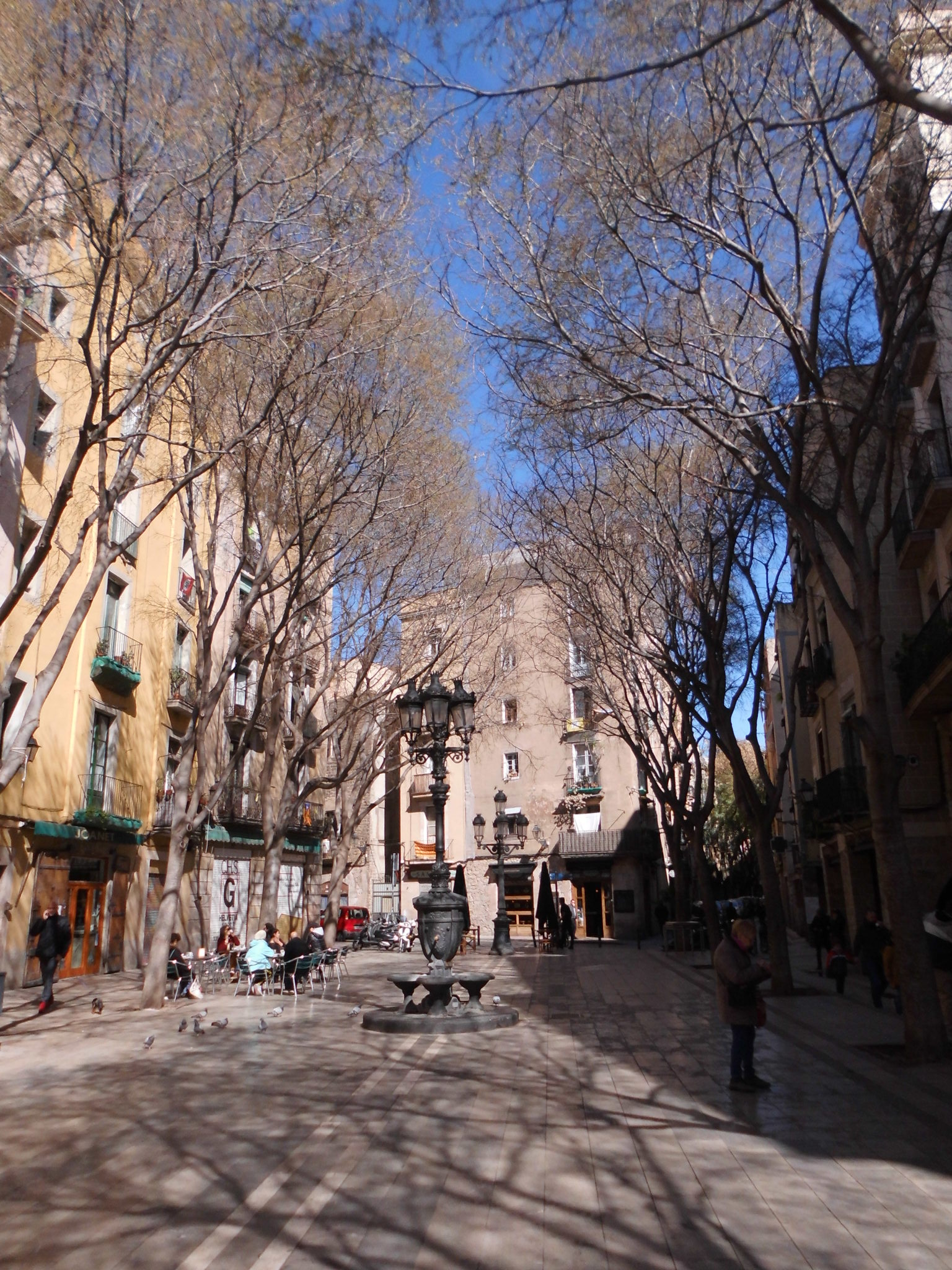
Square of Sant Agustí Vell

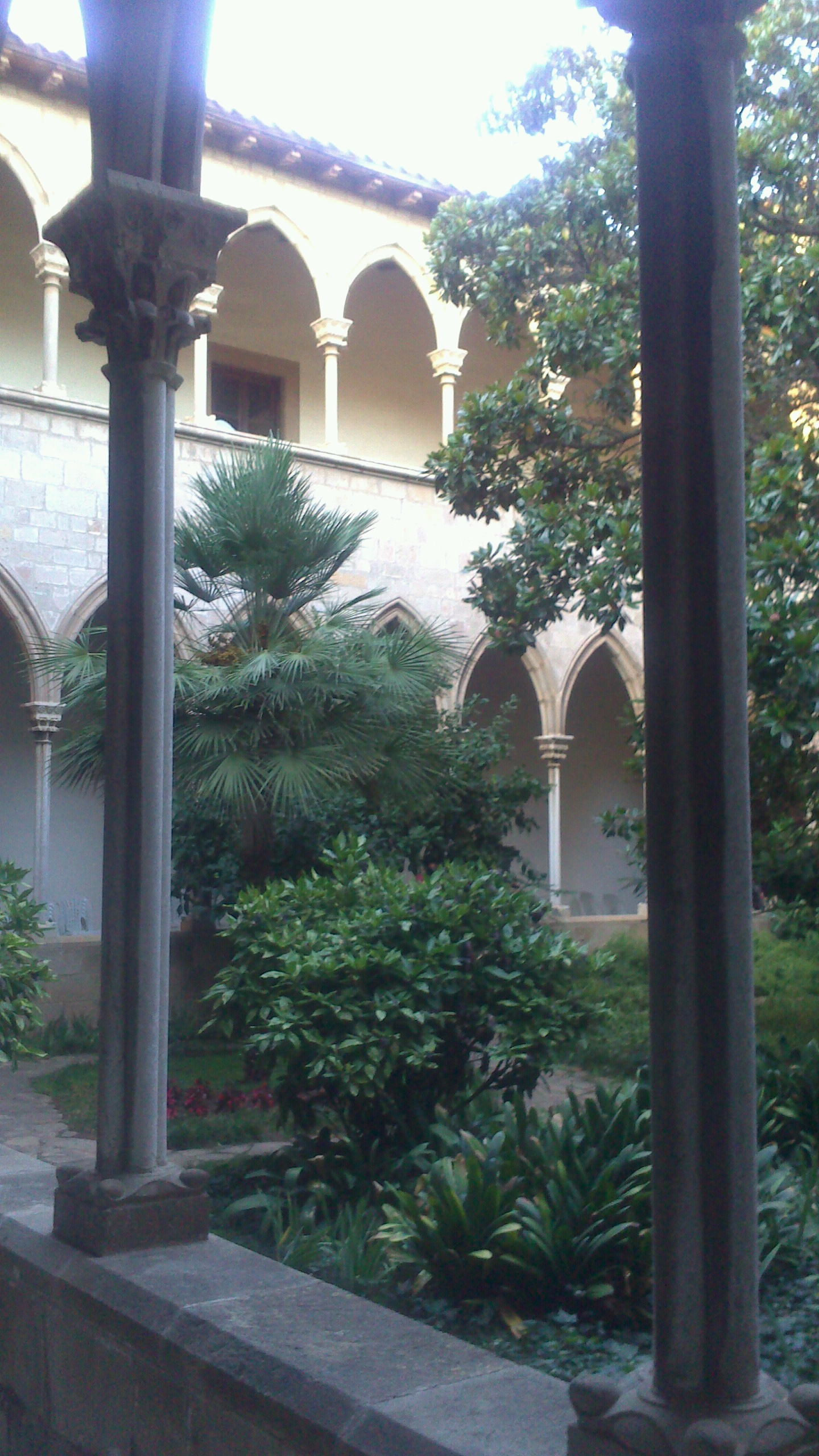
Cloister of the Convent of Santa Maria de Montsió (moved)

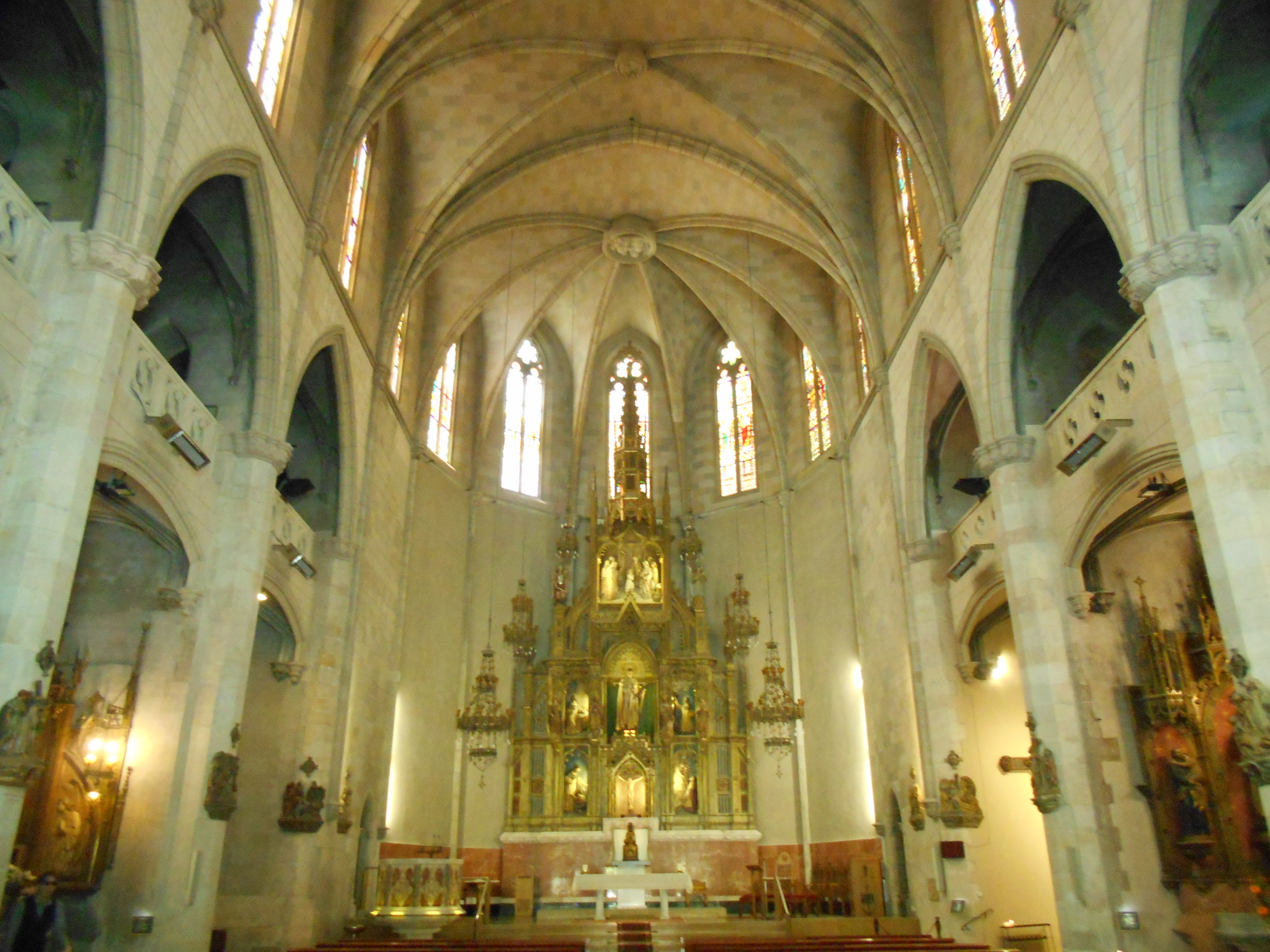
Chapel of Santa Maria de Montsió (moved)
