= Sant Pere de les Puelles =

Benedictine monastery in Barcelona, Catalonia, Spain

Coordinates: 41.389661°N 2.178761°E

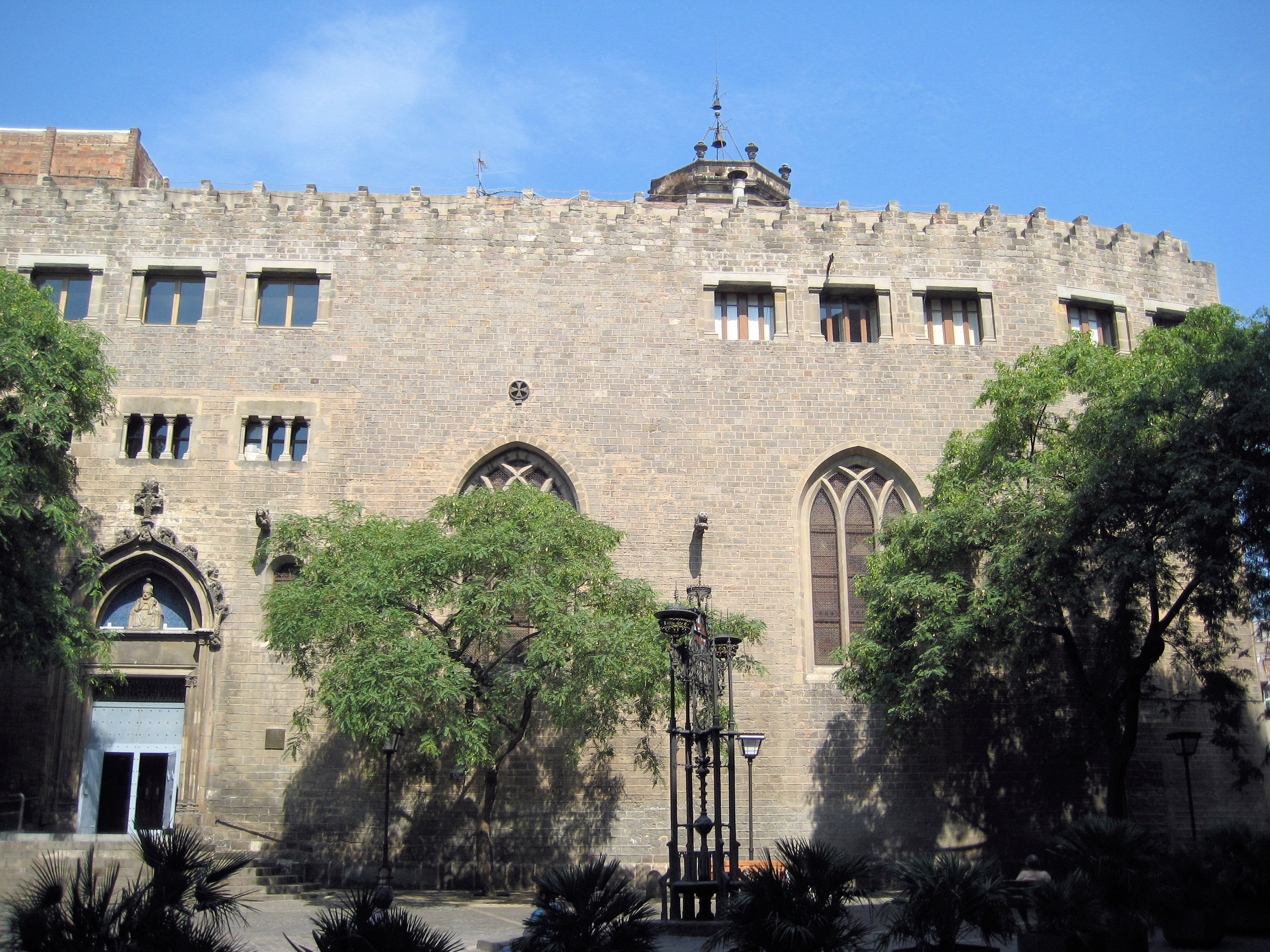
Sant Pere de les Puel·les

Sant Pere de les Puel·les (in Catalan, Puel·les, in Spanish, Real Monasterio de San Pedro de las Puellas) is a Benedictine monastery in the Sant Pere, Santa Caterina i la Ribera neighborhood of the Ciutat Vella district of Barcelona, Catalonia, Spain. The 10th-century building, Romanesque/Gothic in style, was declared a Bien de Interés Cultural landmark in 1931.

== History ==
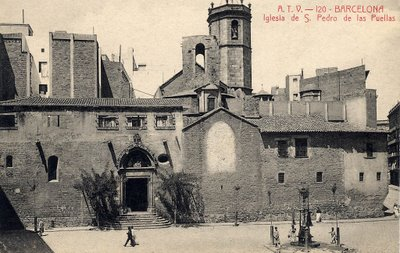
Exterior view (c. 1905)

A nunnery was founded by Count Sunyer I and his wife Richilda of Toulouse next to an ancient church dedicated to Saint Saturnin. The church was consecrated on 16 June 945 by Bishop Guilarà. The first abbess was Adelaide, widow of Count Sunifred of Urgell. In 985, the monastery was attacked by the troops of Almanzor. Count Borrell II restored it; the new abbess was Adalet. The monastery grew slowly. At the end of the 10th century, the community was composed of a dozen religious. In the following century, the number rose to 20, most of them daughters of nobles of the time. The powerful religious families were responsible to financially support the monastery. In 1147, a new, larger church, encompassing both the monastery and the old church dedicated to Saint Saturnin, was consecrated.

The community suffered with the 1835 secularization and the monastery became a prison. In 1879, the religious community moved to a new location in the district of Sarrià-Sant Gervasi. In 1873, the cloister and other sections was removed. The monastery suffered a fire in 1909 after which it was rebuilt. A new fire ravaged the building during the Spanish Civil War in 1939.

== Architecture and fittings ==
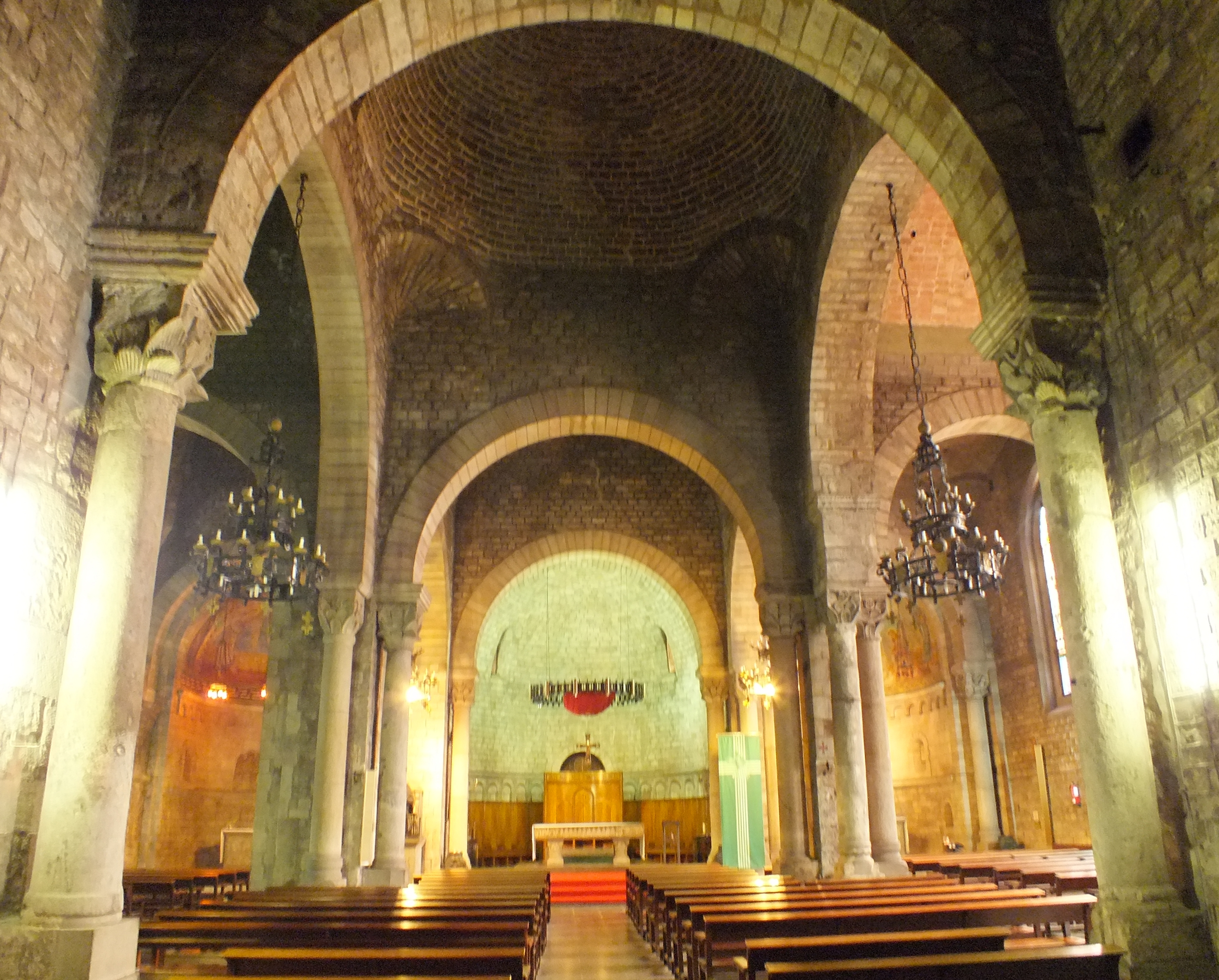
Interior view

Very little remains of the original building, partly because of destruction and partly because of poor restorations It is known that the cloister contained two floors. The lower style, Romanesque, dates to the 11th century while the upper, Gothic style, was built circa 1322. Some elements have been preserved and are distributed in various museums. The original church was constructed in the Greek cross plan. It was bounded by four arches supported by columns and a domed octagonal base. In the area where the present chapel of the Blessed is located, there are remains of the old church of Saint Saturnin which predates Sant Pere de les Puel·les. The monastery had a bell tower, known as the Torre dels Ocells (Tower of Birds) which was destroyed during the fire of 1909. A bell dating to 1752 is present in the octagonal bell tower, which has six bells total.

== Bibliography ==
- Pladevall, Antoni: Els monestirs catalans, Ediciones Destino, Barcelona, 1970 ISBN 8423305112 (in Catalan)
- Paulí Meléndez, Antoni: El Real Monasterio de Sant Pere de les Puel·les
