= Sant Pere de Graudescales =

Monastery in Navès, Spain

Coordinates: 42°06′08″N 1°41′21″E

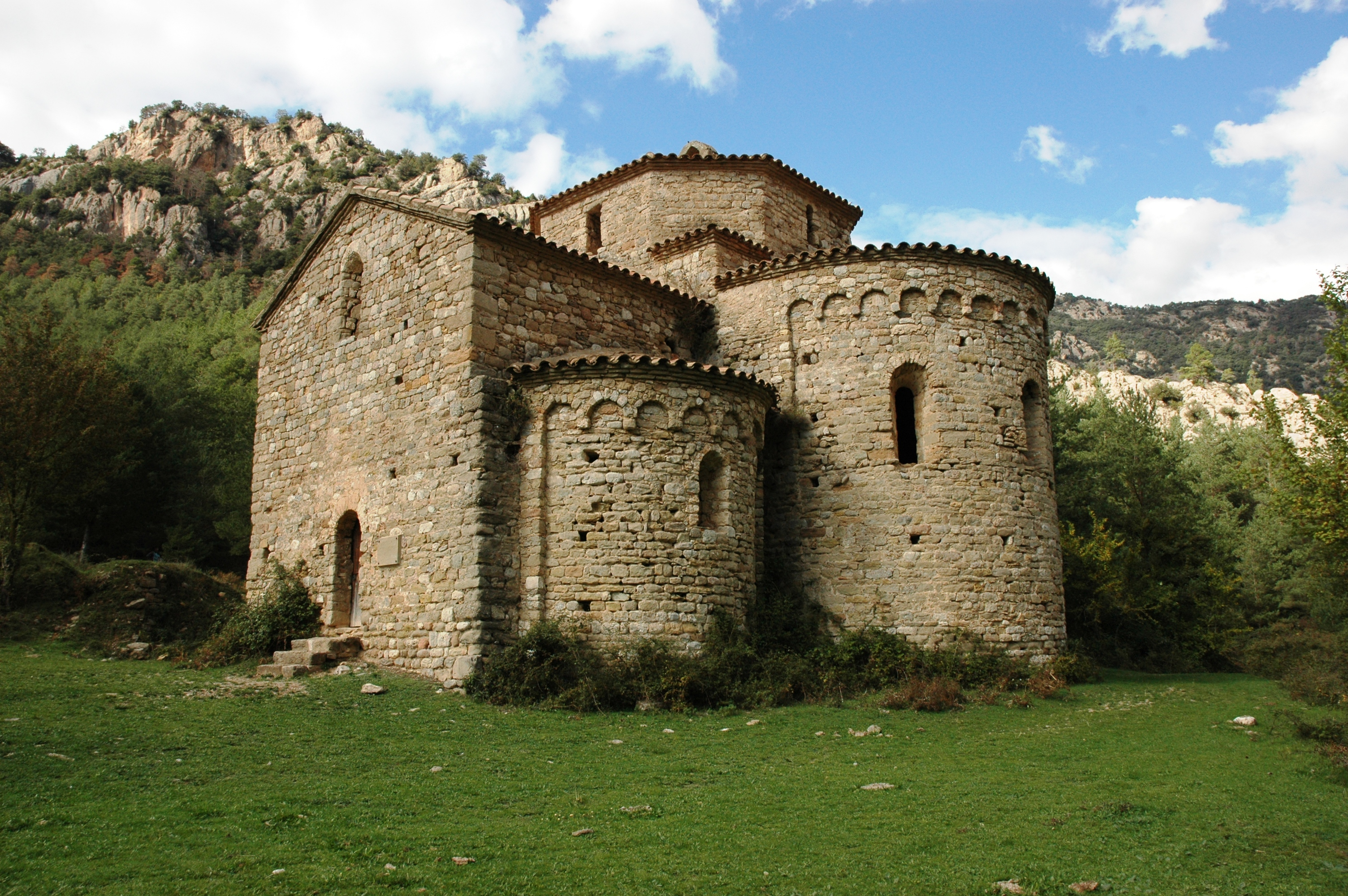
Sant Pere de Graudescales

Sant Pere de Graudescales is a Romanesque Benedictine monastery in La Valldora, in the municipality of Navès, Solsonès, in the Province of Lleida, Catalonia, Spain. It lies to the north of Navès and west of Berga. It was consecrated in 913 by the Bishop of Urgell. From the fifteenth century it was used as a parish church until 1837 when it was abandoned and gradually fell into ruin. Sant Pere de Graudescales was excavated and restored during the second half of the 20th century.
