= Sant Pere, Barcelona =

Coordinates: 41°23′4.59″N 2°10′57.78″E

Sant Pere
- Former and traditional neighborhood of Barcelona
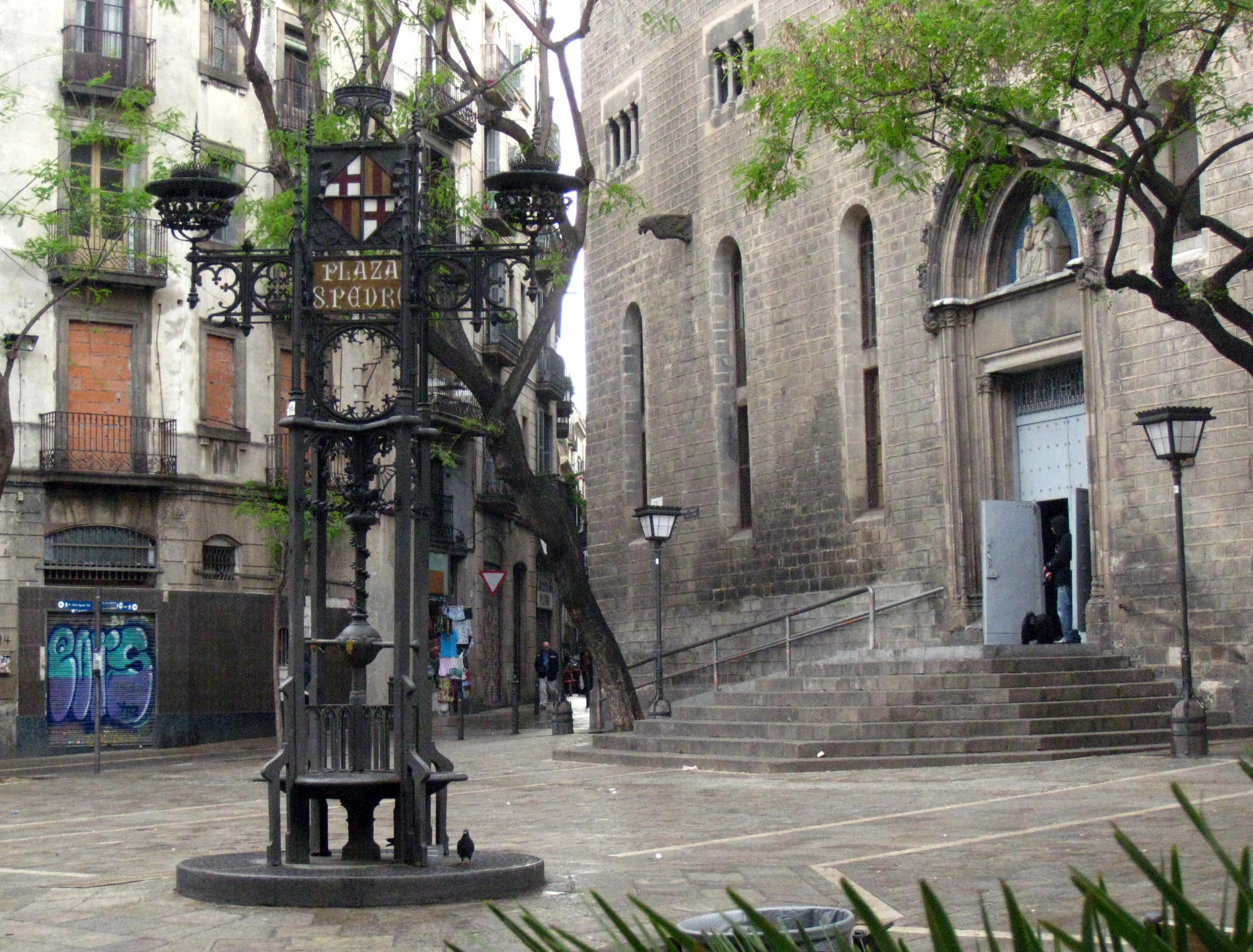
- Plaça de Sant Pere, with Sant Pere de les Puelles in the background

- Map of Sant Pere, Santa Caterina i la Ribera within Barcelona
- Country: Spain
- Autonomous Community: Catalonia
- Province: Barcelona
- Comarca: Barcelonès
- Municipality: Barcelona
- District: Ciutat Vella
- Neighborhood: Sant Pere, Santa Caterina i la Ribera
- Postal code: 08003

Sant Pere (Catalan pronunciation: [ˈsam ˈpeɾə], Barri de Sant Pere in Catalan) is a traditional neighborhood of the old city of Barcelona, Spain. It is named after the monastery Sant Pere de les Puelles. Nowadays, it is a part of the Sant Pere, Santa Caterina i la Ribera neighborhood.

== Points of interest ==
- The neighborhood received its name from the 10th century monastery of Sant Pere de les Puelles, (Saint Peter of the Innocents), at Lluís El Piadós 1. The monastery is named after girls that disfigured themselves to avoid rape and murder.
- The Palau de la Música Catalana (Palace of Catalan Music) concert hall designed by Lluís Domènech i Montaner is located at Carrer Sant Francesc de Paula 2.

== Gallery ==
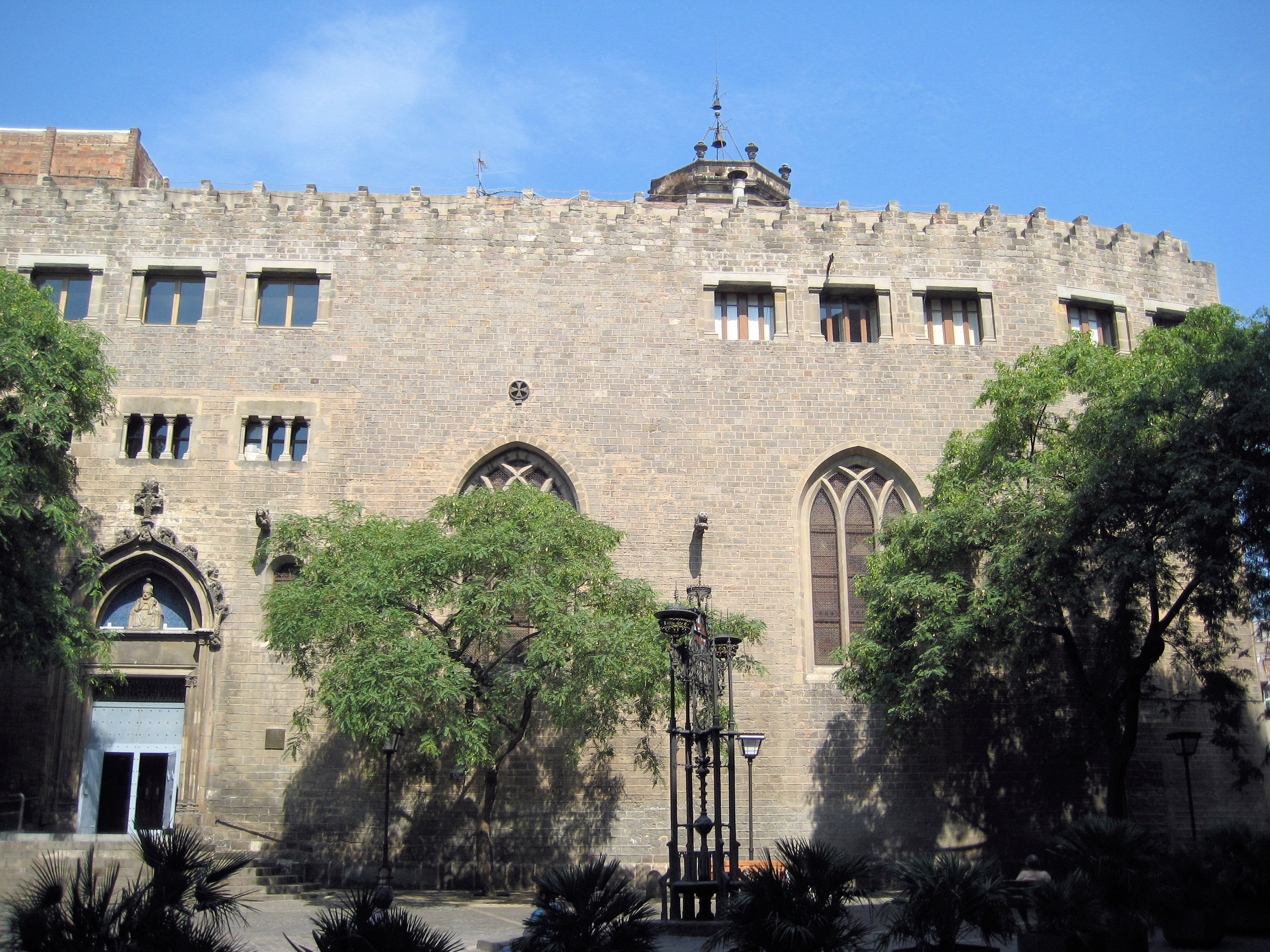
Sant Pere de les Puel·les

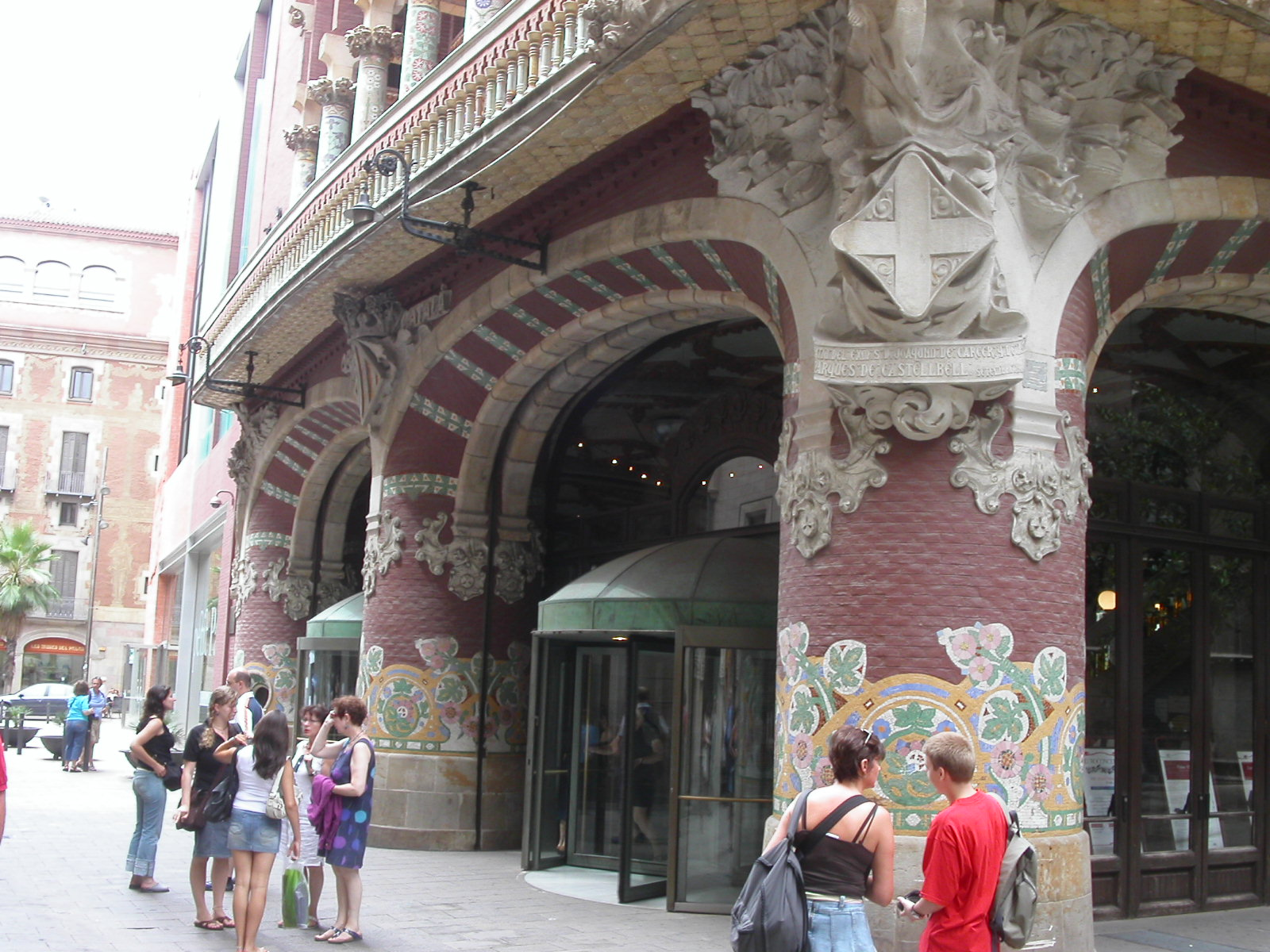
Palau de la Música Catalana
