= Font del gat (Rec Comtal) =

Coordinates: 41°23′16″N 2°10′50″E

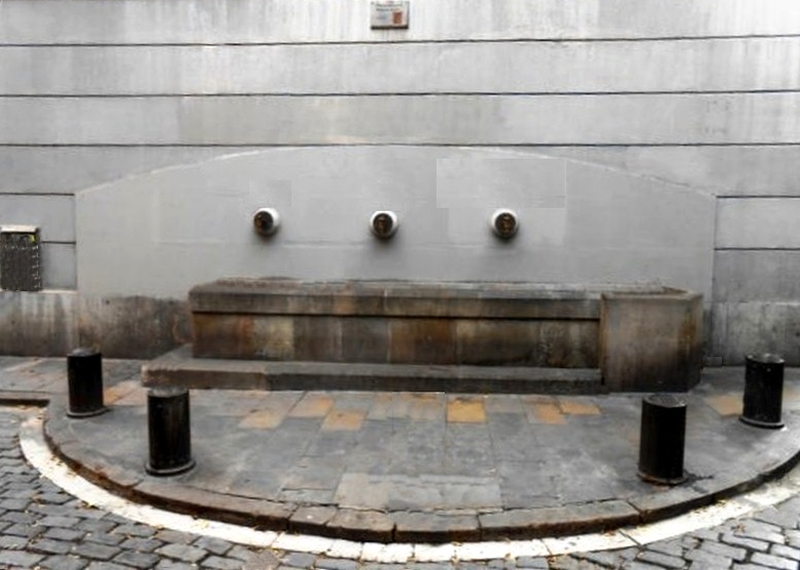

General information
- Location: Barcelona, Spain

The Font del Gat or Font de Sant Agustí Vell is a Gothic fountain (reconstructed) located in the Barri de Ribera of Barcelona. It is on the ground floor of the house with its main facade towards the Plaça de Sant Agustí Vell and placed on the corner of Carders and Tantarantana streets (below which the Rec Comtal is used to feed the fountain).

It is a very significant fountain in Barcelona, since the main use was as a watering trough for the horses of the carriages that entered to Barcelona via the Portal Nou.

== History ==
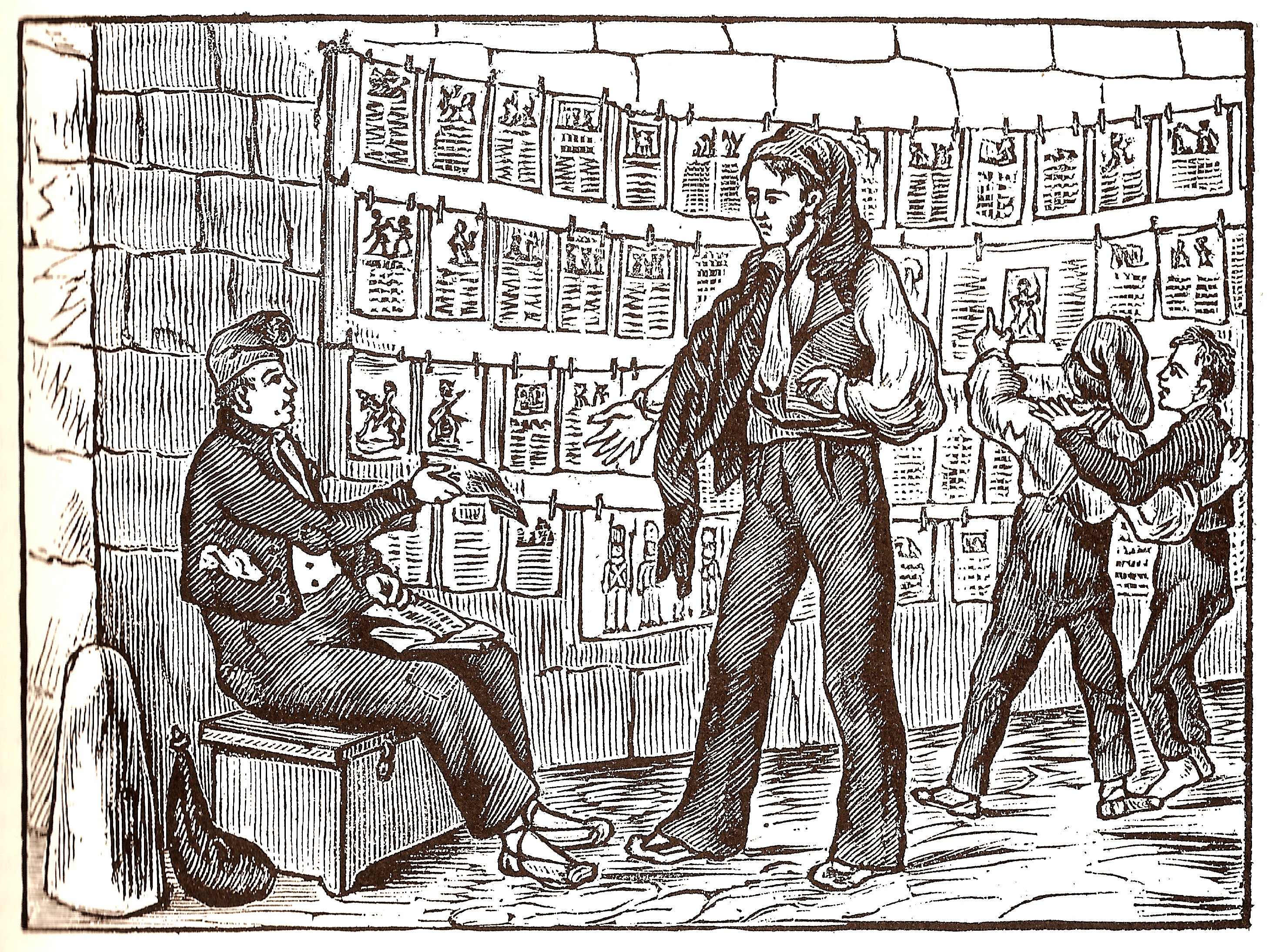
Illustration about the blind man's romances sold in "folds of cane and cord", on the wall of the Font de Sant Agustí Vell in a Catalan engraving from 1850 (collected by Joan Amades in 1984).

The first preserved vestiges of fountains located in roads or public buildings come from the Middle Ages, when the city was part of the Crown of Aragon. It was an important maritime and commercial axis of the Mediterranean Sea. The city area grew from the primitive urban core - what is today the Barri Gòtic - and in the 14th century the Raval neighborhood emerged. Barcelona then had around 25,000 inhabitants.

In this period, several fountains were created throughout the city, to ensure a regular supply to the population. Just as the industrial use of water was ensured with the Rec Comtal and the channeling of water from Montjuïc to the Pla de la Boqueria, domestic consumption was mainly carried out through wells, which depended on rainfall and they caused supply shortages in times of drought. Thus, at this time several fountains were opened, most of them eminently utilitarian in nature, and therefore there was not much room for artistic creation.

=== Demolition ===
Until the beginning of the last century, the water came out of a cat's head, which is why it was called Font del Gat, to distinguish it from the one on the other side of the square (more modern Canaletes style ). Unfortunately this original fountain disappeared when the council demolished the house in 1996 to build social housings. In the place where the fountain was, they left an Office of La Caixa d'Estalvis. After a while, when the residents claimed it, the city council made a replica (with three faucets as seen in the main photo), since they could not find the stones of the original fountain.

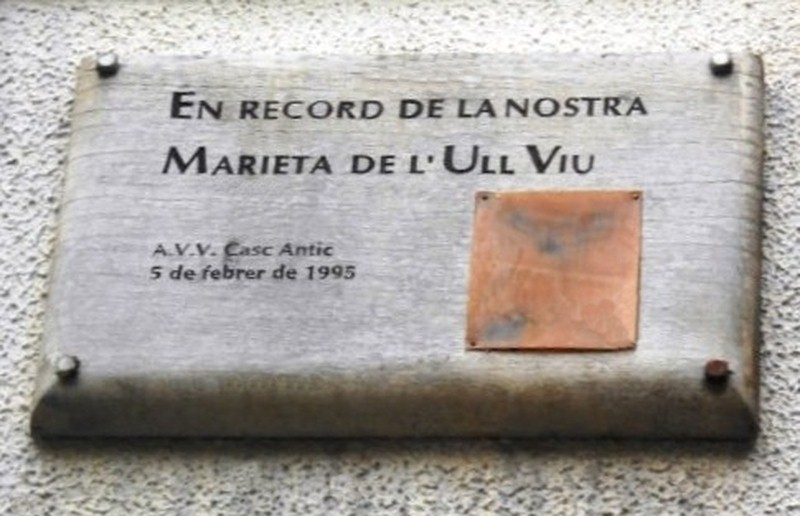
Remembering Marieta de l'Ull Viu

== Controversy ==
It is popularly known as the real Font del Gat or as Font de la Marieta de l'Ull Viu (the one from the song Baixant de la Font del Gat), given that the Font del Gat from Montjuich dates from 1928 and could not be that of the popular song which existed before. The name Marieta de l'ull viu is given as a memory of Marieta who, according to the tradition of the neighborhood, was born in Carrer Portal Nou, without ever leaving the district and that the lyrics "descending from the font del gat, a girl and a soldier" would have to say "passing by the fountain of the gat..." because near the square there was (until a few years ago, converted into a recruit box) the military barracks built on the Convent of Sant Agustí, demolished by order of Philip V, for having been a center of strong resistance in the Barri de Ribera in 1714.

== Gallery ==
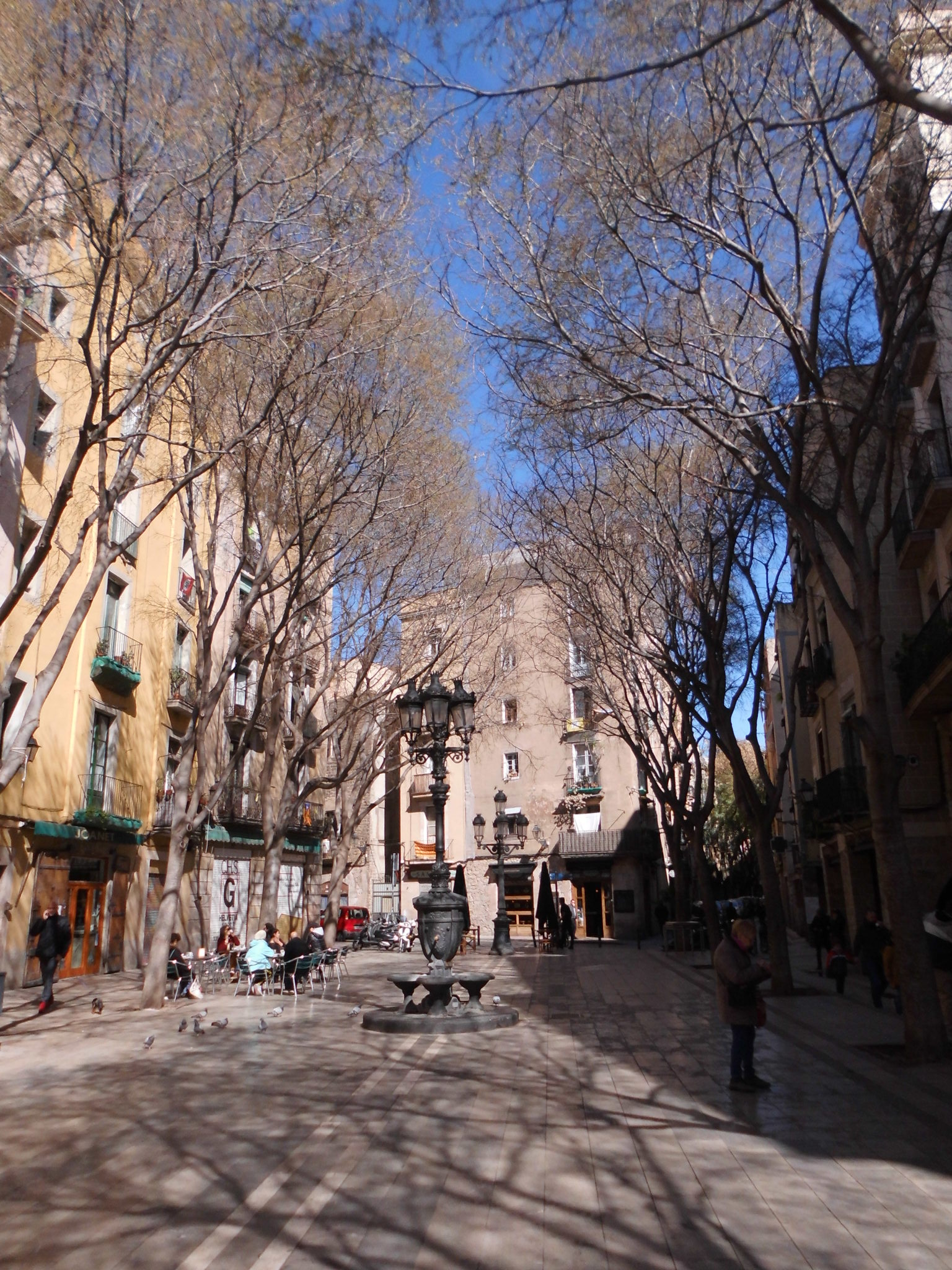
Square of Sant Agustí Vell

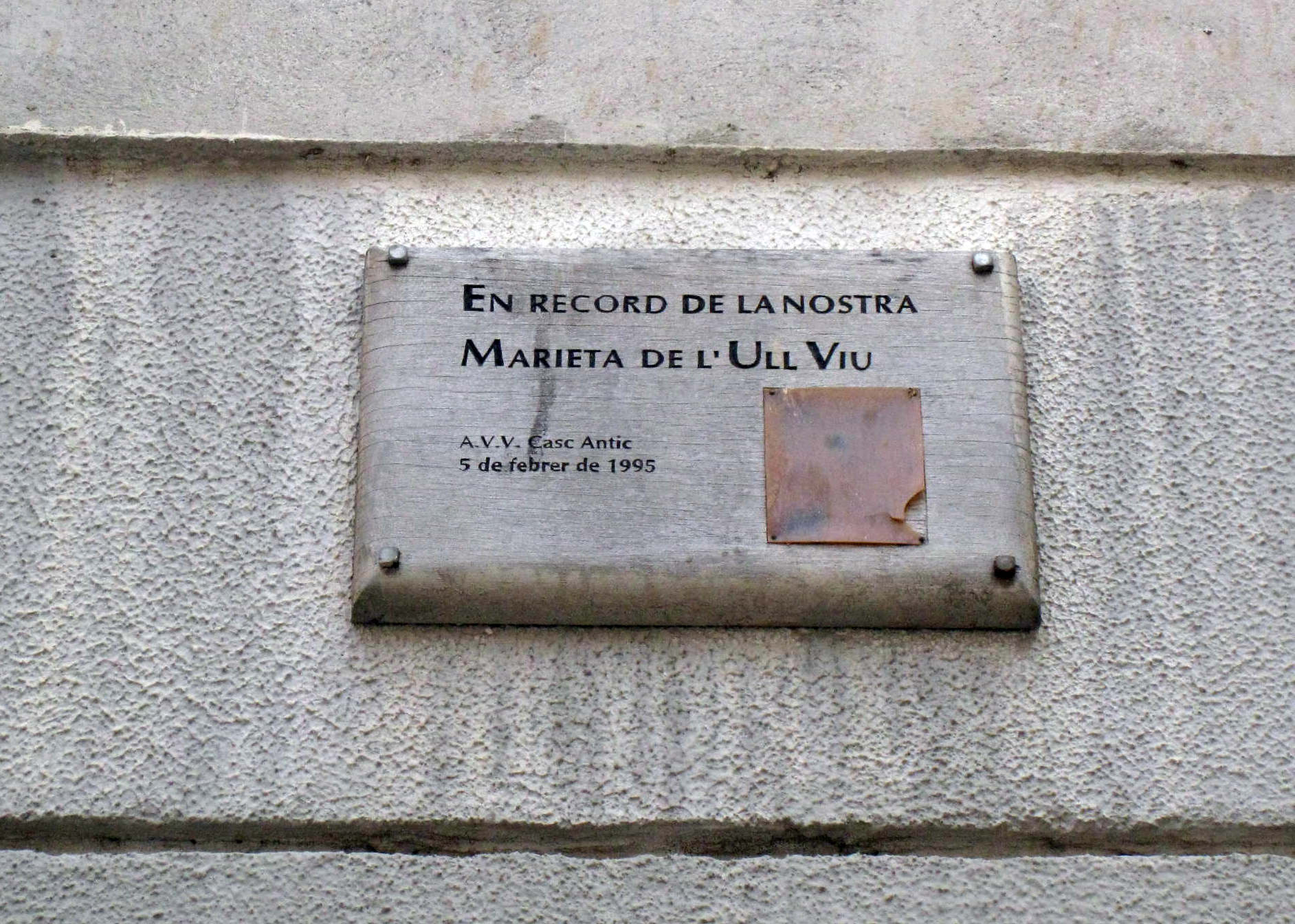
Plate dedicated to Marieta de l'Ull Viu

== See also ==
- Convent of Sant Agustí Vell

== Bibliography ==
- Artís Tomàs, Andreu-Avel·lí (Sempronio) (1972). 100 fuentes de Barcelona. Barcelona: Sociedad General de Aguas de Barna.
- Cesàreo, Pere (1986). Barcelona art i aigua : Fonts públiques i ornamentals. Barcelona: Aldina. ISBN 84-86627-001.
- Lecea, Ignasi de; Fabre, Jaume; Grandas, Carme; Huertas, Josep M.; Remesar, Antoni; Sobrequés, Jaume (2009), Art públic de Barcelona (in Catalan), Barcelona: Ayuntamiento de Barcelona y Àmbit Serveis Editorials, ISBN 978-84-96645-08-0
- Martín Pascual, Manel (2009). Barcelona: aigua i ciutat. L'abastament d'aigua entre les dues Exposicions (1888-1929). Barcelona: Marcial Pons. ISBN 978-84-9768-671-6.
- Riutort, Josep Maria (1946). Historia y leyenda de las fuentes urbanas y campestres de Barcelona. Barcelona: Millà.
- Vázquez Montalbán, Manuel (1990). Barcelona fuente a fuente. Madrid: Repsol. ISBN 84-7368-107-X.
