= Ciutat Vella =

- District of Barcelona
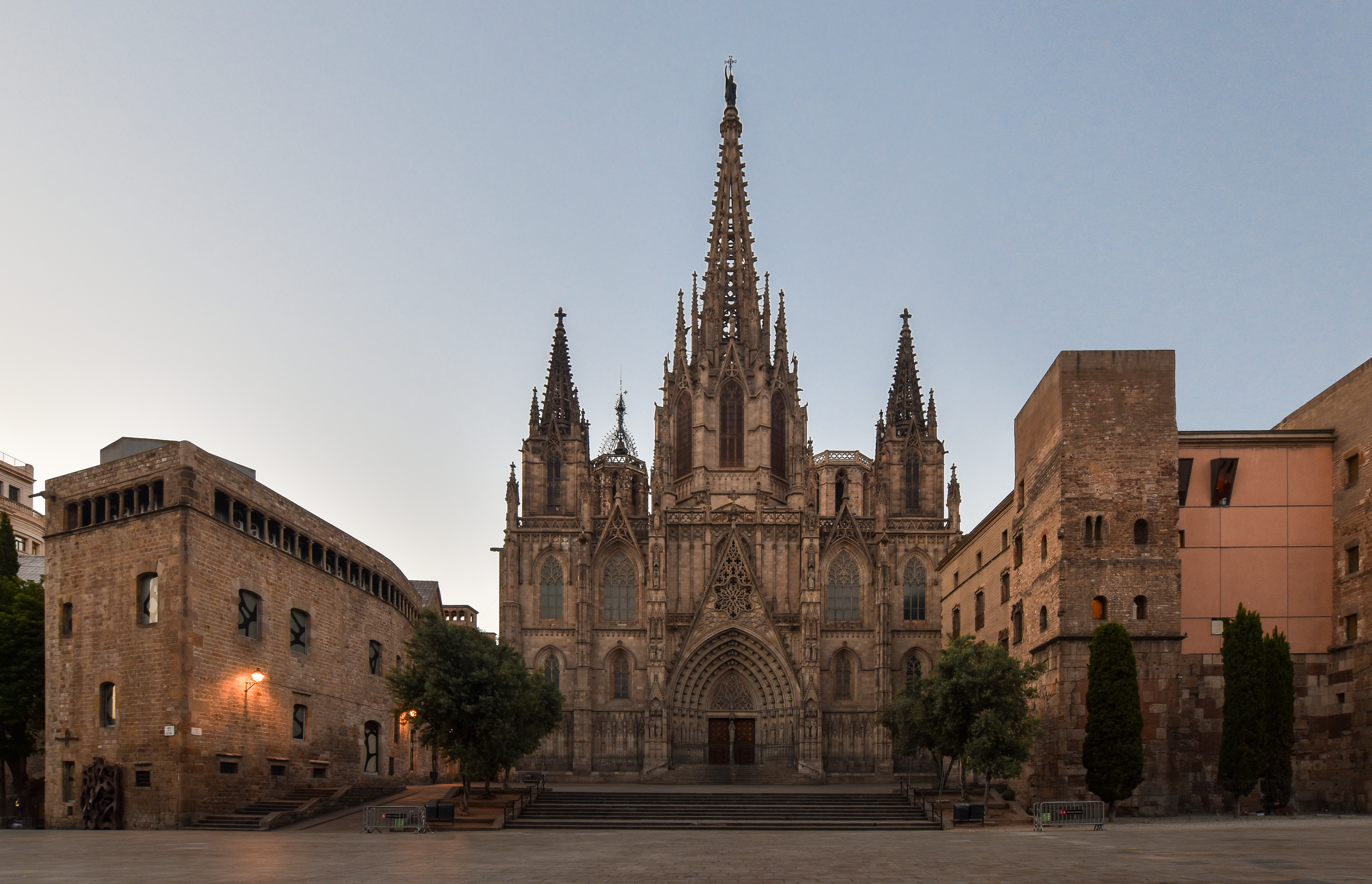
- Interactive map of Ciutat Vella
- Coordinates: 41°22′51″N 2°10′23″E
- Country: Spain
- Autonomous Community: Catalonia
- Province: Barcelona
- Comarca: Barcelonès
- Municipality: Barcelona
- Neighbourhoods: El Raval, El Gòtic, La Barceloneta, Sant Pere, Santa Caterina i la Ribera

Area
  - Total: 4.37 km^{2} (1.69 sq mi)

Population (2009)
  - Total: 107,426
  - Density: 24,600/km^{2} (63,700/sq mi)
- Website: bcn.cat/ciutatvella

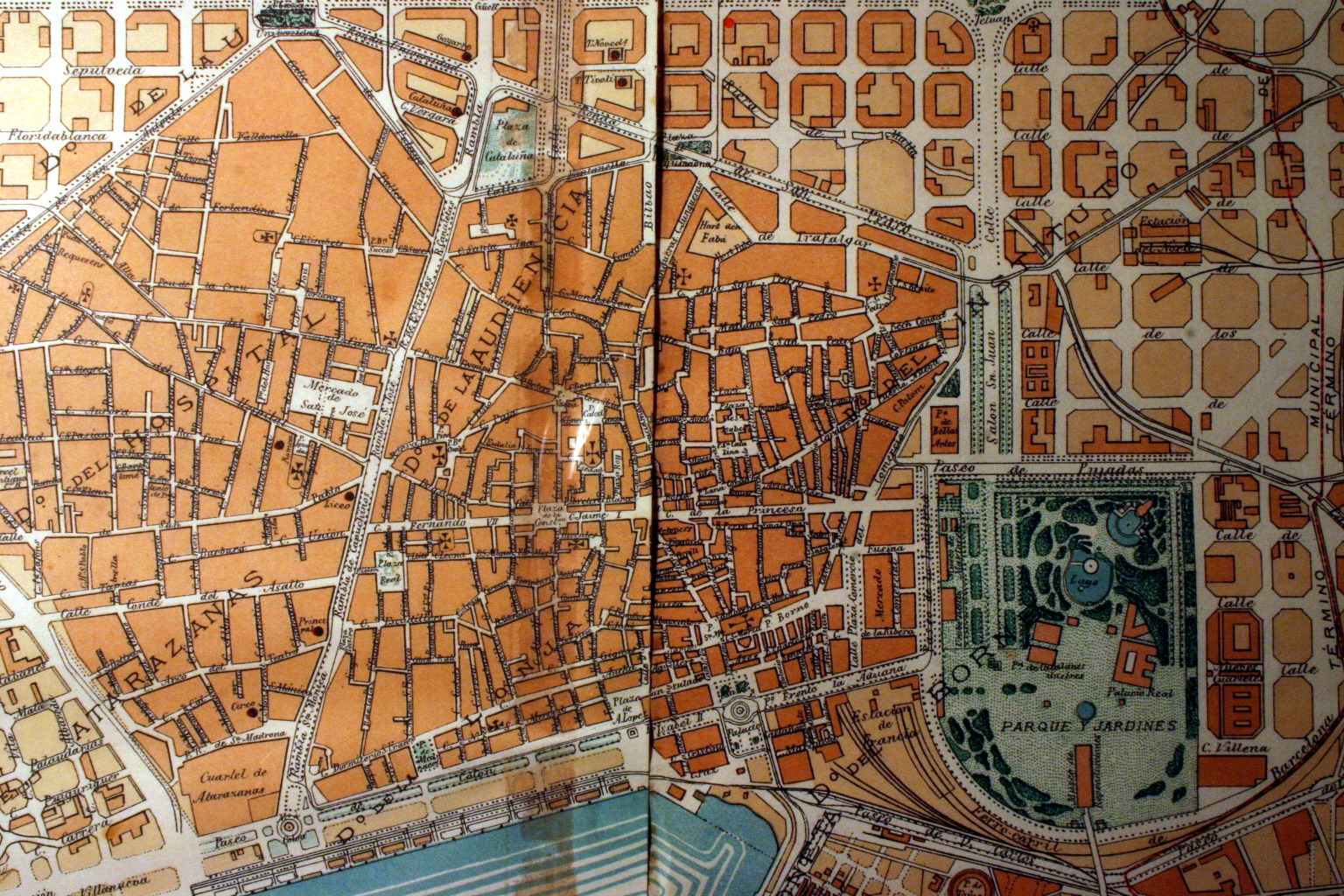
1860 map.

Ciutat Vella (Catalan pronunciation: [siwˈtad ˈbeʎə], meaning in English "Old City") is a district of Barcelona, numbered District 1. The name means "old city" in Catalan and refers to the oldest neighborhoods in the city. Ciutat Vella is nestled between the Mediterranean Sea and the neighborhood called l'Eixample ("the Extension").

There are four administrative neighborhoods (some of them include former or traditional neighborhoods):

- La Barceloneta
- El Gòtic
- El Raval
- Sant Pere, Santa Caterina i la Ribera:
  - Sant Pere
  - Santa Caterina
  - La Ribera

== Les Rambles ==
Running down the center of the Ciutat Vella (dividing the Raval and Barri Gòtic) are the boulevards Les Rambles, popularly known as La Rambla (in singular) since they are continuous, like a single street. Les Rambles stretches from Plaça Catalunya to the Mediterranean Sea and, since the 1990s, now extends out over the sea into one of Barcelona's newest centers of entertainment, Maremàgnum. Each of Les Rambles has its own specialty. La Rambla de les Flors (The Flowers Rambla) is devoted to flower stands, another Rambla to animal vendors (selling mainly birds), and the lowest Rambla hosts temporary art fairs. El Mercat de Sant Josep (more commonly known as La Boqueria) and Gran Teatre del Liceu (Barcelona's Opera House) are both located here. Les Rambles are among the most frequently travelled streets by pedestrians in Barcelona.

At the bottom, there is the Museu Marítim (naval museum), which chronicles the history of life on the Mediterranean, including a full-scale model of a galley. The museum is housed in the medieval Drassanes (shipyards), where the ships that made Catalonia a great sea power in the Mediterranean were built.

== Raval ==
This portion of the city is often referred to as el Barri Xinès, or Chinatown. The Museu d'Art Contemporani de Barcelona (Contemporary Art Museum of Barcelona), the Rambla del Raval (a walkway to the sea) and the Filmoteca de Catalunya are in this neighborhood.

== Gothic Quarter ==
On the other side of La Rambla, is the Gothic Quarter. This neighborhood houses the Barcelona Cathedral, the Palau de la Generalitat de Catalunya, and the Barcelona City Hall. Tourists visit this neighborhood to see Royal Square (a Spanish-style plaza) and to shop in one of the tourist shops along Ferran street. The Museu Picasso can be found in the area known as el Born, within the Barri Gótic, in addition to the historic restaurant Els Quatre Gats (The Four Cats), which was a popular hang-out for artists, including Pablo Picasso.

To the north of the Gothic Quarter lie the Jardins de Fonseré i Mestre which contain modernist buildings housing zoological and geological collections. The adjacent Parc de la Ciutadella includes both the Parliament of Catalonia and the Barcelona Zoo whose most famous resident was an albino gorilla, Snowflake, who died in 2003 of skin cancer.

== La Ribera and El Born ==
The adjacent sectors of La Ribera and El Born were originally developed outside the city's Roman walls as a medieval merchant and maritime hub. The area has now transitioned into a bohemian zone characterized by narrow alleyways filled with independent boutiques and cocktail bars. The urban area has elements of 19th-century industrial design and Catalan Modernisme. The two sectors making up the neighborhood were frequently compared to Paris' Montmartre.

The Basilica de Santa Maria del Mar is the neighborhood's focal point, constructed in the 14th century by local dockworkers and residents. In remembrance of those who died in the Siege of Barcelona in the War of Spanish Succession, an eternal flame is kept burning in the adjacent Fossar de les Moreres square. The UNESCO Heritage site and concert hall Palau de la Música Catalana is located towards the north of the neighborhood. With it, the quarter serves as one of Barcelona's premier artistic center, anchored by the Museu Picasso in the neighboring Gothic Quarter. Nearby, local history is preserved at the El Born Centre de Cultura, located inside the former Mercat del Born.

== La Barceloneta ==
La Barceloneta is a seaside, triangular neighborhood bordered by the Mediterranean Sea to the east, Port Vell to the west, and El Born to the north. Historically, the neighborhood was a working-class enclave of fishermen, sailors, and dockworkers. Its early public life is anchored by the Sant Miquel del Port church in its central square, alongside architectural remnants of the pre-Modernisme Catalana de Gas water tower and the Mercat de la Barceloneta market. The neighborhood is also home to several preserved maritime and historical monuments, such as the Torre del Rellotge clocktower, Rebecca Horn's Homenatge a la Barceloneta monument, and the fountain dedicated to Carmen Amaya.

In the mid-19th century, La Barceloneta became Barcelona's premier destination for sea-bathing, leading to an economic boom in local hospitality and dining sectors. The neighborhood underwent a structural transformation for the 1992 Summer Olympics during which industrial shorelines were cleared for modern public beaches. Several major architectural works dot the waterfront as decorations, including the W Barcelona hotel and Frank Gehry's El Peix sculpture near Port Olímpic.

== See also ==
- Districts of Barcelona
- Street names in Barcelona
- Urban planning of Barcelona
