= Sant Pere, Santa Caterina i la Ribera =

Neighborhood in the Ciutat Vella district of Barcelona

Coordinates: 41°23′4.59″N 2°10′57.78″E

- Neighborhood of Barcelona
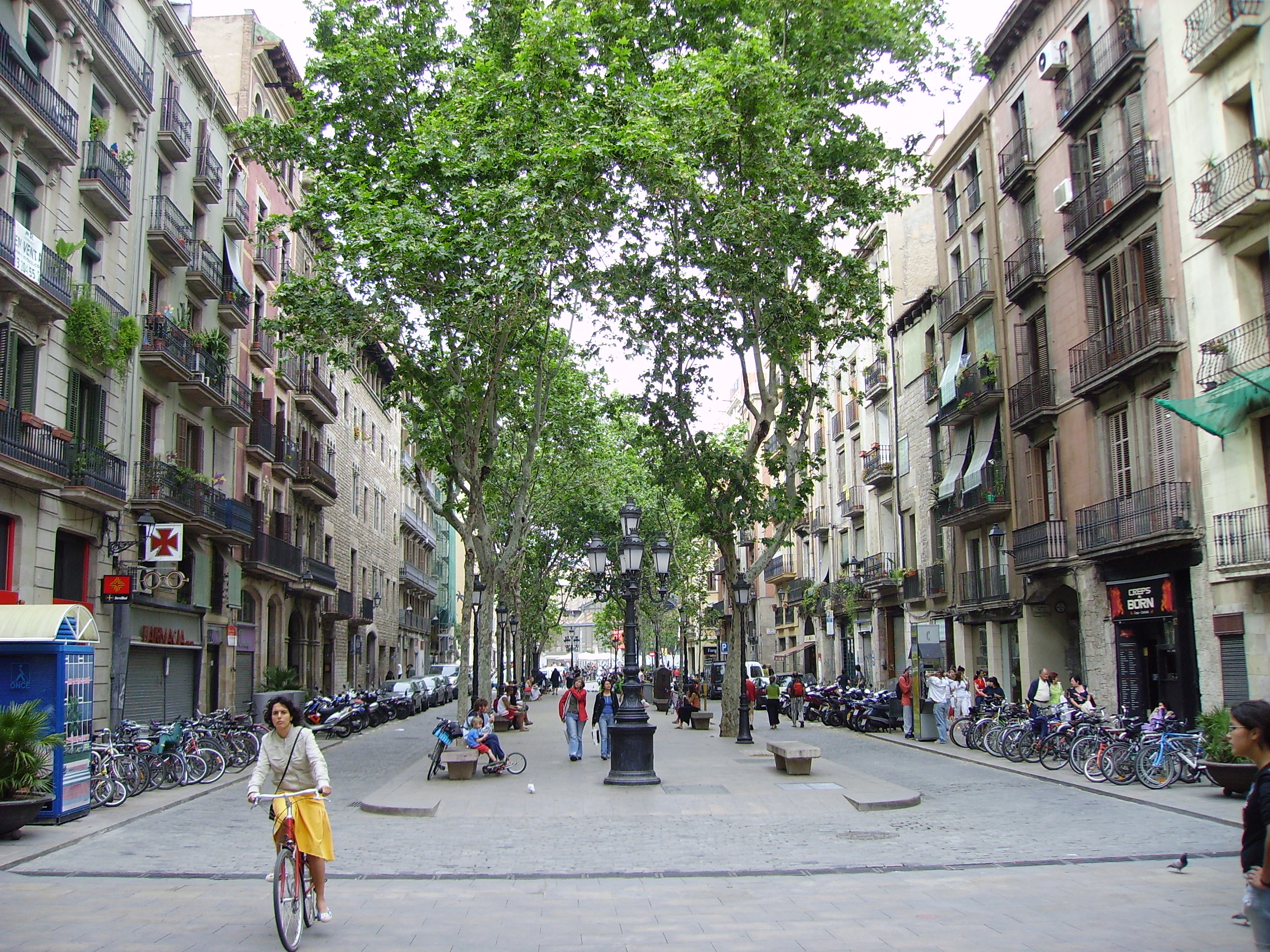
- Passeig del Born, in la Ribera

- Map of Sant Pere, Santa Caterina i la Ribera within Barcelona
- Country: Spain
- Autonomous Community: Catalonia
- Province: Barcelona
- Comarca: Barcelonès
- Municipality: Barcelona
- District: Ciutat Vella

Population (2023)
  - Total: 22,041
- Postal code: 08003 (mainly), 08018
- Website: ajuntament.barcelona.cat

Sant Pere, Santa Caterina i la Ribera (Catalan pronunciation: [ˈsam ˈpeɾə ˈsantə kətəˈɾinəj lə riˈβeɾə]) is a neighborhood in the Ciutat Vella district of Barcelona, Catalonia (Spain). It is formed by the former neighborhoods of Sant Pere, Santa Caterina and la Ribera. The southeastern part of this area, just below Carrer de la Princesa, and leading to Barceloneta, is often referred to as "El Born."

A close subway stop for many staying in this neighborhood is Jaume I (primer), which is situated on the yellow L4 line.

== In the media ==
- The Cheetah Girls 2, a scene was recorded at Passeig del Born.
