= Francesc Daniel Molina i Casamajó =

Spanish architect

- Born: 1812; Vic
- Died: 1867 (aged 54–55); Barcelona
- Other names: Francisco Daniel Molina
- Education: Escola de la Llotja, Real Academia de Bellas Artes de San Fernando
- Occupation: Architect
- Notable work: Royal Square (Barcelona)

Francesc Daniel Molina i Casamajó (Vic, 1812–Barcelona, 5 July 1867) was a Spanish architect.

== Biography ==
He was born in the city of Vic, Barcelona Province, in 1812. He completed his early studies at Escola de la Llotja, (Note: English: Llotja School) an art and design school in Barcelona. In 1843, he graduated from the Real Academia de Bellas Artes de San Fernando (Note: English: Royal Academy of Fine Arts of San Fernando) in Madrid. And then, in 1850, he was elected fellow of the Reial Acadèmia Catalana de Belles Arts de Sant Jordi. (Note: English: Royal Catalan Academy of Fine Arts of Saint George)

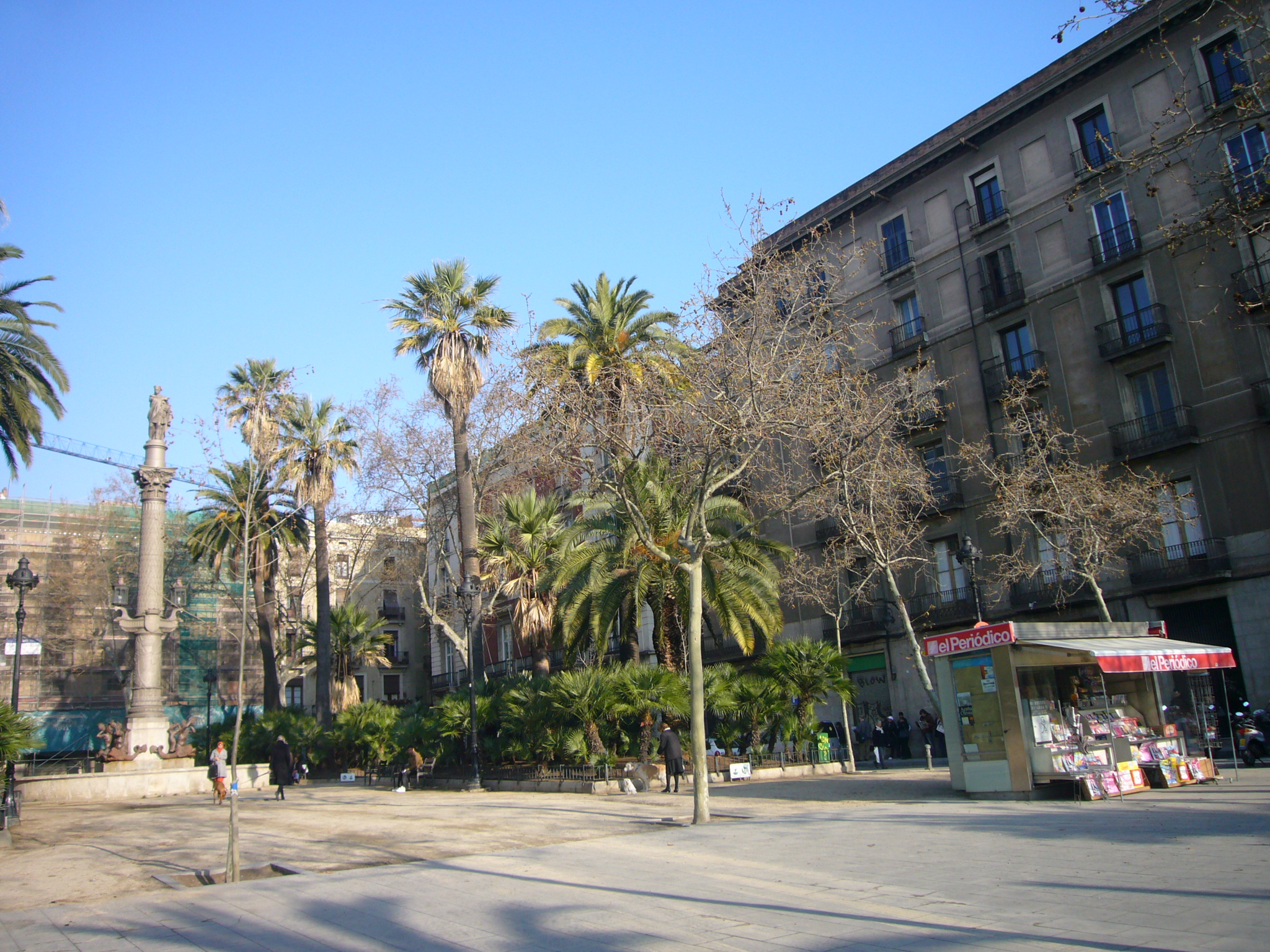
Plaça del Duc de Medinaceli

In 1851, he designed the Plaça del Duc de Medinaceli (Note: English: Duke of Medinaceli Square) square in Barcelona. The following year, he built the Santuari de la Mare de Déu de la Misericòrdia (Note: English: Sanctuary of Our Lady of Mercy) church in the municipality of Canet de Mar.

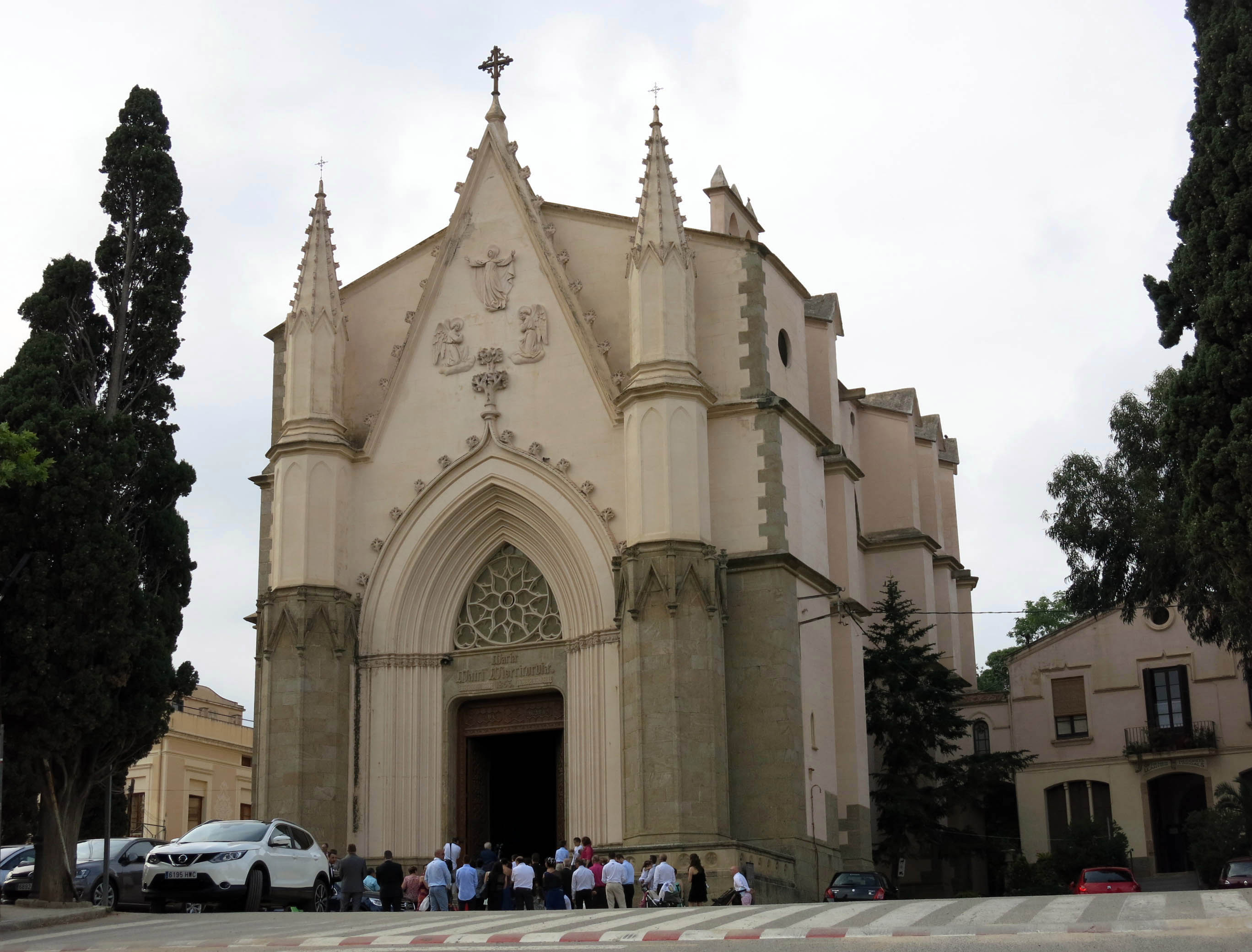
Santuari de la Misericòrdia de Canet de Mar

Furthermore, in 1852, he was commissioned to design a monument to the memory of Minister of War Francisco Bernaldo de Quirós, Marquis of Campo Sagrado. The monument was completed in 1856 and it is known as the Font del Geni Català, (Note: English: Fountain of the Catalan Spirit) a historic fountain built in the neoclassical style and located in the Pla de Palau (Note: English: Palace Square) square in Barcelona.

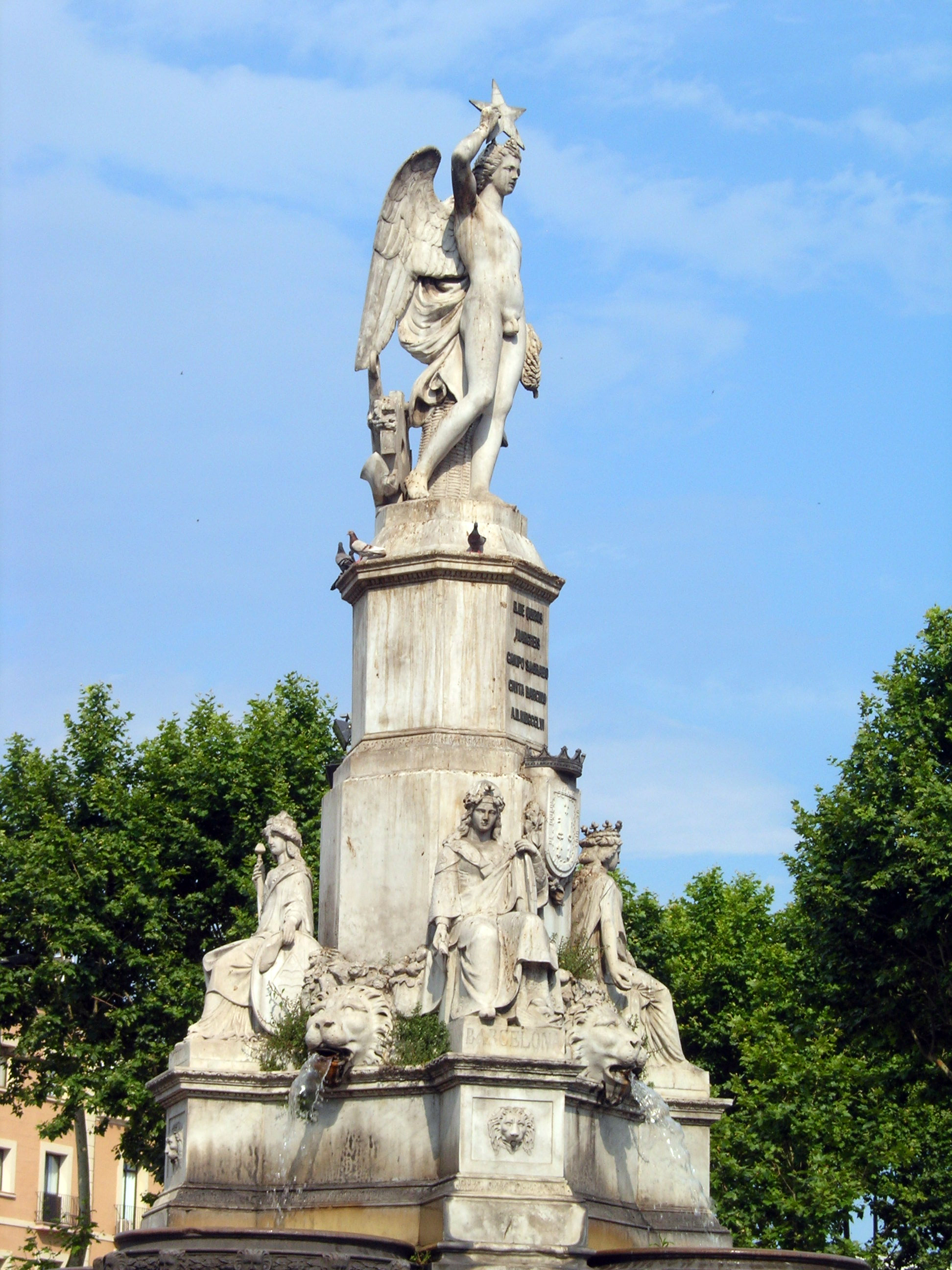
Font del Geni Català

But Molina's most important project was that of the Royal Square in Barcelona (1848–1859). It is considered the traditional Spanish main square, with its Elizabethan-style façades and arcaded ground floor, in the same style as the façade of the Teatre Principal, (Note: English: Main Theater) after his restoration following a fire in 1845.

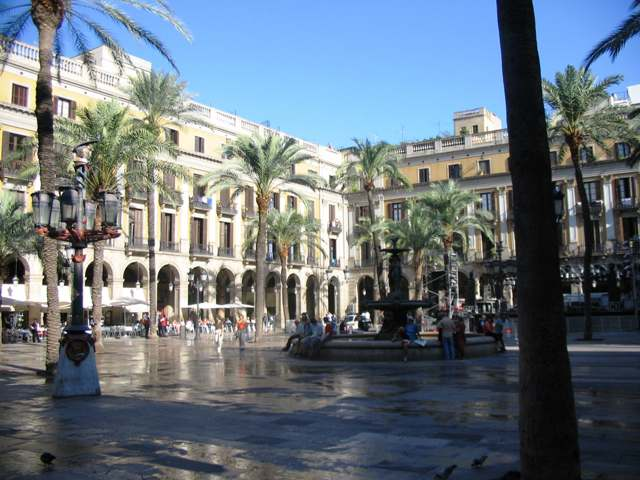
Royal Square in Barcelona

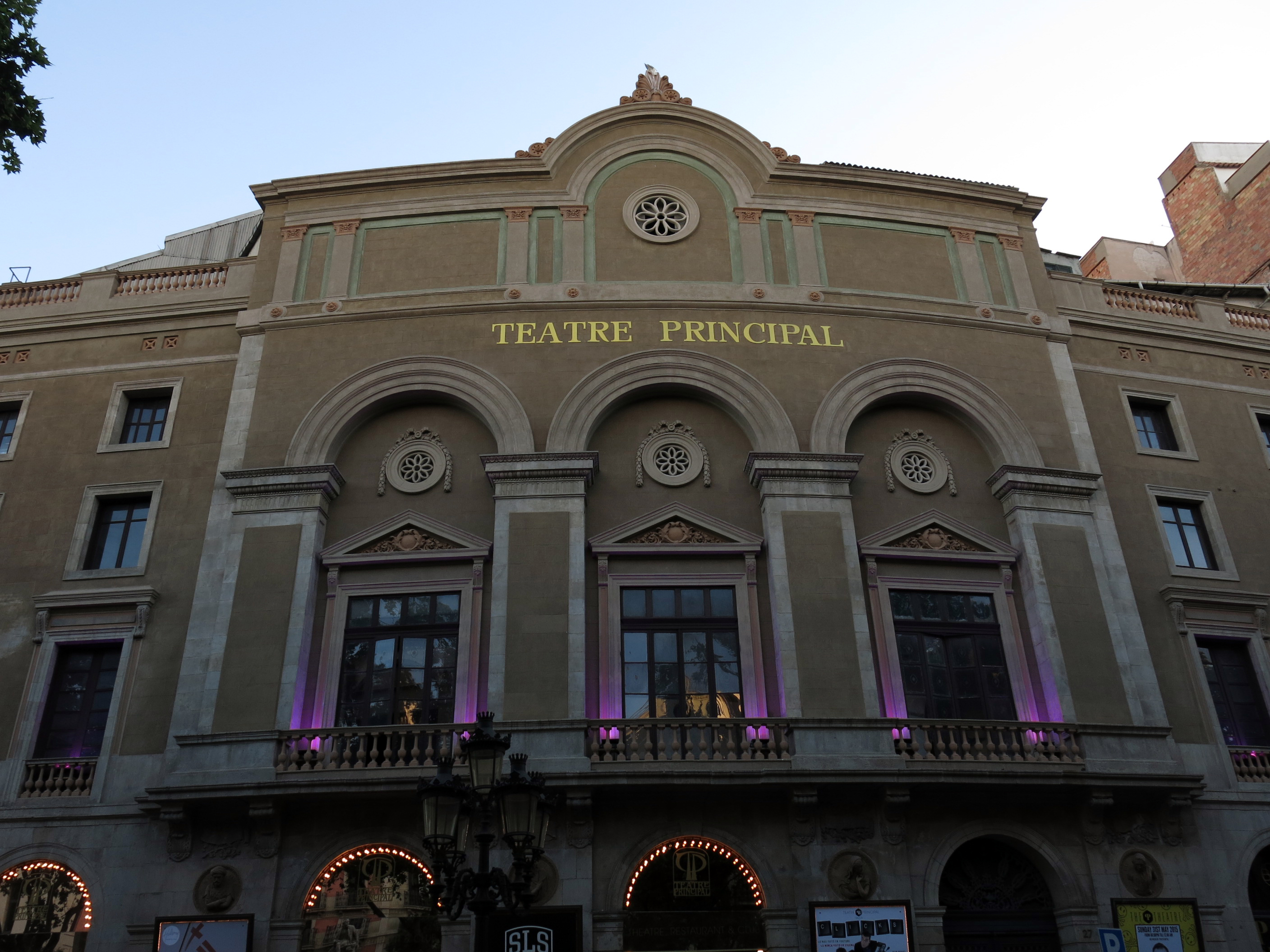
Teatre Principal

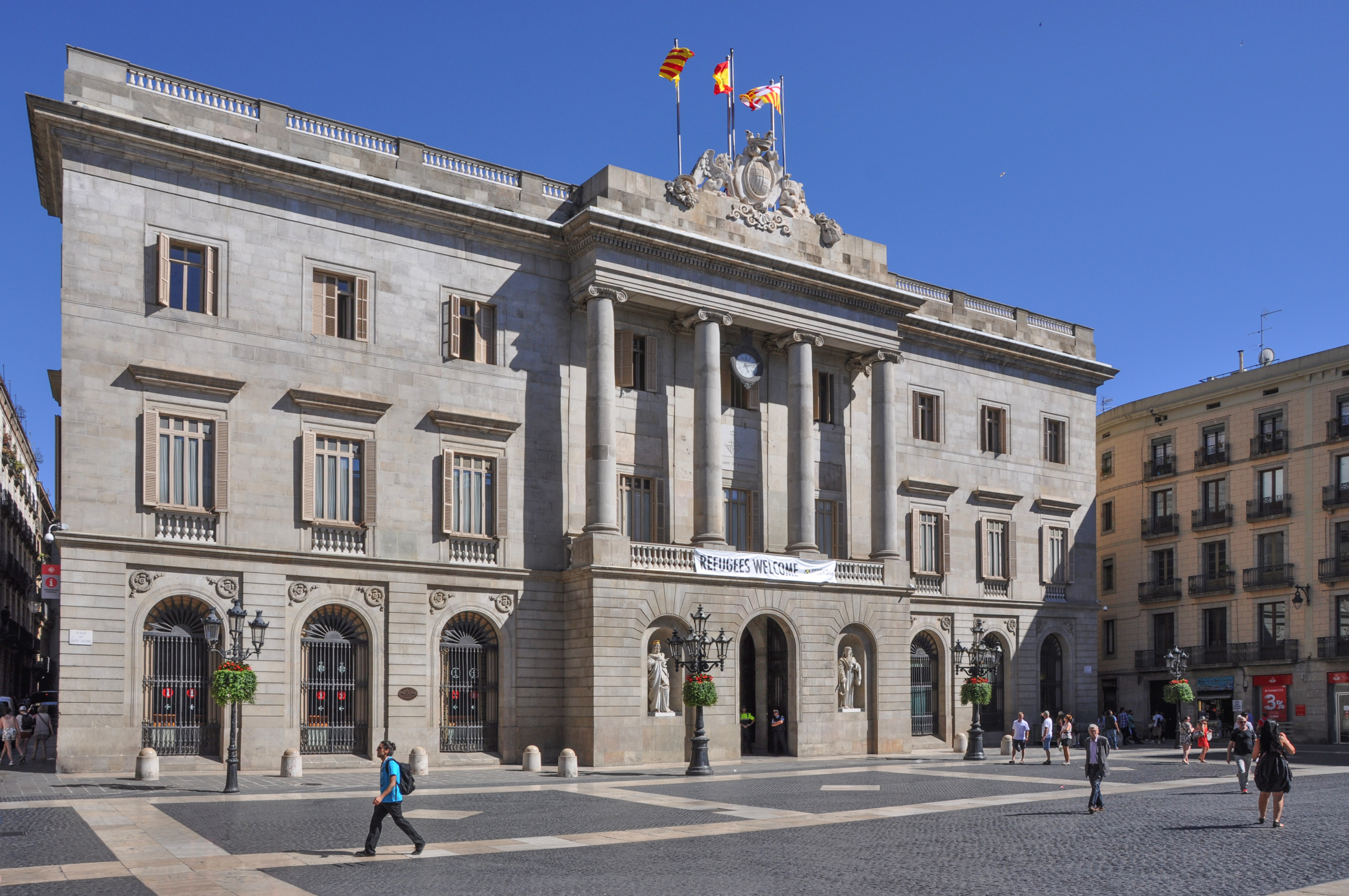
Barcelona City Hall

He served as the council architect of Barcelona in 1855, succeeding Josep Mas i Vila. He worked on the coat of arms on the pediment of the neo-Gothic façade of Barcelona City Hall, as well as the Saló de la Reina Regent, (Note: English: Hall of the Queen Regent) (Note: In September 2016, the name was changed to Carles Pi i Sunyer Hall, in honor of Carles Pi i Sunyer, who served as the Minister of Labour and Social Economy in 1933, under the administration of Diego Martínez Barrio.) which was finished in 1860. In 1865, influenced by the Cerdà Plan for Barcelona, he drafted an urban renewal plan for Sabadell, but it fell through.

== Bibliography ==
- Alcalde Vilà, Sergi (2011). "El projecte inicial del Santuari de la Misericòrdia de Francesc Daniel Molina" (PDF). El Sot de l'Aubó (in Catalan). No. 36. Canet de Mar, Spain: Centre d'Estudis Canetencs. ISSN 2014-5969.
- Antigüedad del Castillo-Olivares, María Dolores; Nieto Alcaide, Víctor; Martínez Pino, Joaquín (2015). El siglo XIX: la mirada al pasado y la modernidad (in Spanish). Spain: Editorial Universitaria Ramón Areces. ISBN 978-84-9961-195-2.
- Balaguer, Víctor (1888). Las calles de Barcelona en 1865: (complemento de la historia de Cataluña) (in Spanish). Madrid.
- Carrera Pujal, Jaime (1957). La escuela de nobles artes de Barcelona (1775-1901) (in Spanish). Barcelona: Bosch.
- de Solà-Morales i Rubió, Manuel (1997). "Ensanches". Las formas de crecimiento urbano (in Spanish). Barcelona, Spain: Edicions UPC. ISBN 9788483011973.
- García Melero, José Enrique (2002). Literatura española sobre artes plásticas (in Spanish). Spain: Ediciones Encuentro. ISBN 978-84-7490-649-3.
- Gras, Irene; Freixa, Mireia (2016). Acadèmia I Art. Dinàmiques, transferències i significació a l'època moderna i contemporània (in Catalan). Edicions de la Universitat de Barcelona. ISBN 9788447540037.
