= Lampposts of Plaça Reial =

Pair of streetlamps in Barcelona designed by Antoni Gaudí

- Fanals de la Plaça Reial (Catalan)
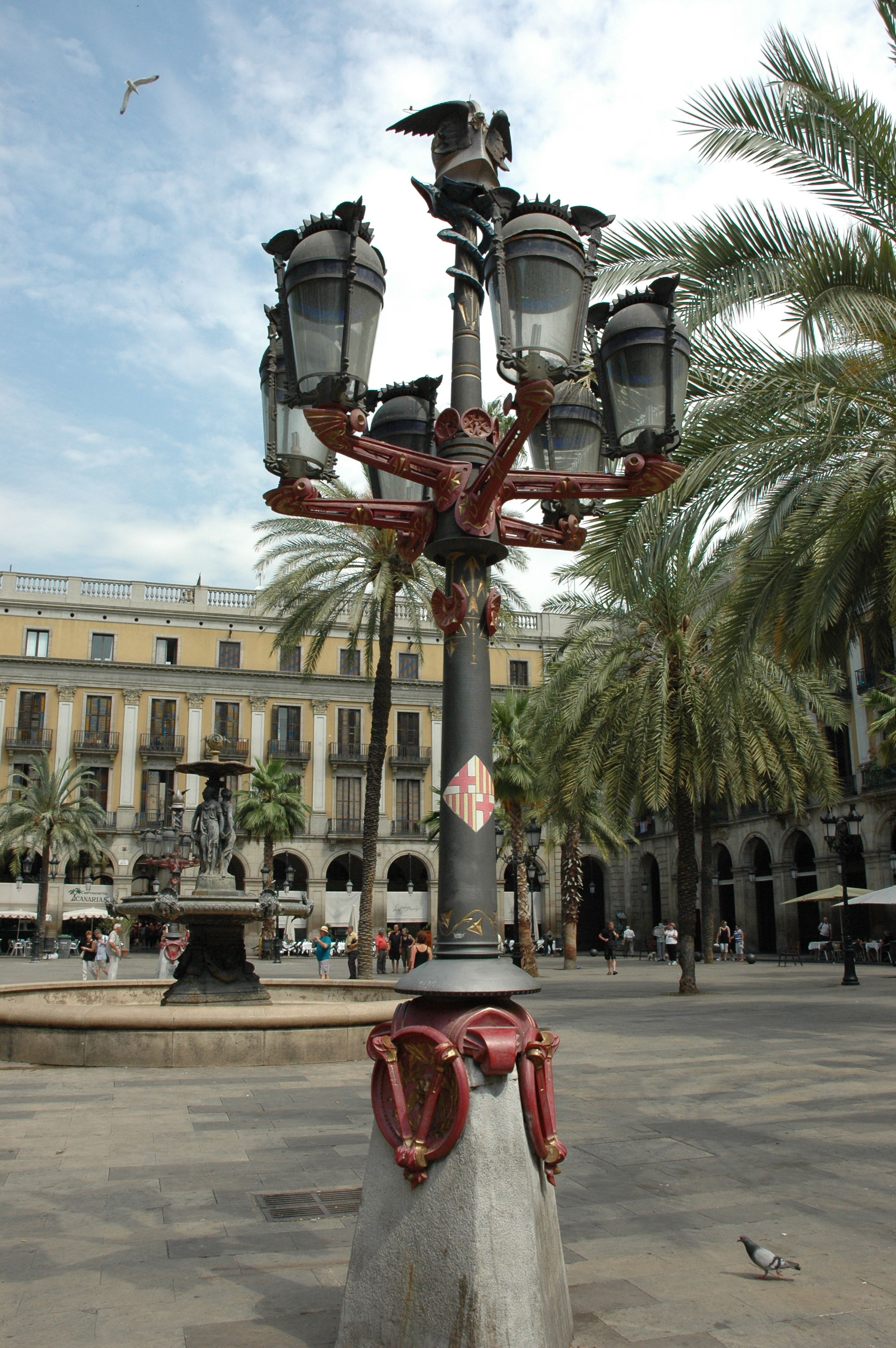
- One of the two lampposts designed by Antoni Gaudí in Plaça Reial
- Artist: Antoni Gaudí
- Year: 1878 to 1879
- Medium: Cast iron on a marble plinth
- Dimensions: About 3 metres high
- Location: Plaça Reial, Barcelona

A pair of cast iron streetlamps with six arms in Plaça Reial, Barcelona, are among the first works of Antoni Gaudí and the first to reach the public street. He designed them in 1878, when he had just qualified as an architect, and they were installed on 24 September 1879. They are listed as a Bé Cultural d'Interès Local (local cultural heritage asset). They are one of only two works that Gaudí completed for the public administrations. Gaudí called them candelabros (candelabra) rather than lampposts, and they are known by that name in much of the literature.

== Background ==
As a student, Gaudí had worked as a draughtsman for the master builder Josep Fontserè, whose designs for the Parc de la Ciutadella included monumental lamps at its entrances. Their central shaft was crowned by a helmet topped with the bat emblem of Barcelona, which a contemporary magazine read as a reproduction of the war helmet of James I of Aragon. Symbolic street lighting was not new in the city. In 1857 the municipal architect Miquel Garriga i Roca had drawn up "symbolic lampposts" for the Pla del Palau that combined the emblem of commerce with the coats of arms of the nation and the city, a design that Sama compares to Gaudí's.

Plaça Reial had been laid out around its central fountain, the Fountain of the Three Graces, which was imported from the French foundry of Antoine Durenne. The fountain was unpopular with the Catalanist press, and some commentators saw Gaudí's lamps as restoring local pride beside it. The square itself was designed in 1848 by Francesc Daniel Molina on the site of a former Capuchin convent.

== Commission and design ==
On 19 February 1878 a committee of Barcelona City Council agreed to commission a model of group streetlamp, and the commission was communicated to Gaudí, then 25, in a letter of 27 February. It was first given to the designer and decorator Jaume Serra Gibert, but when he died suddenly it was granted to Gaudí, apparently through the intervention of the architect Joan Martorell, with whom both had worked.

In June 1878 Gaudí submitted the Proyecto de candelabro de grupo para plazas y paseos de Barcelona ("Project for a group candelabrum for squares and promenades of Barcelona"), a long descriptive report accompanied by a watercolour at a scale of 1:10 showing the six armed model, which is now lost. The report, addressed to the mayor, Albert Faura Aranyó, is kept in the Barcelona Municipal Archive and is one of very few project memoirs by Gaudí that survive. In it Gaudí thanked the mayor for the commission and argued that city streets needed ornament as well as comfort:

Modern towns, and especially mercantile ones, have the public street as the theatre of half the lives of their inhabitants. [...] But in these streets austere comfort is not enough; art must dress them and give new distinction to a place already pleasant in itself.

— Antoni Gaudí, Candelabro. Apuntes descriptivos (1878)

On the place of ornament in southern cities, he wrote:

...in our southern countries one does not go out into the street solely out of necessity. Hence we have, and ought to have, our streets more richly ornamented than in other countries.

— Antoni Gaudí, Candelabro. Apuntes descriptivos (1878)

He proposed a triangular plinth with chamfered corners in polished dark marble known as Santa Cruz, from which a conical shaft would rise, carrying the arms with the lanterns and crowned by a commercial emblem. The shape of the shaft, he wrote, was what a column fixed at its base must mechanically have, and it also eased the industrial polishing and finishing of the iron. For the finial he chose the winged caduceus of Mercury, which he presented as a synthesis of the history and commercial vocation of Barcelona, rooted in Greek colonisation, and the coat of arms of the city was to occupy the shaft. According to the Fundación Antoni Gaudí, the report specified metal elements with a polychrome scheme of gold, blue and red, and polychrome shields of Barcelona at the centre of the shafts. The report also suggested that four lamps of three lights could replace the old lamps in front of the City Hall. It insisted on the quality of the execution:

The principal part of our candelabrum is its execution, which must be proper, simple and careful, that is, carried out with love. For the architect, the most finished plans, the most detailed description and the most scrupulous budget are important for a perfect creation.

— Antoni Gaudí, Candelabro. Apuntes descriptivos (1878)

After a complicated administrative process, the council first commissioned a prototype, which Gaudí completed in December 1878. On 14 December he wrote to the mayor about how the lamps should be executed, stressing their double purpose of lighting and ornament. The sculptural parts were modelled by Llorenç Matamala, with whom Gaudí collaborated for decades, including at the Sagrada Família, and the iron casting was commissioned from the Valls company. A photograph kept at the Real Cátedra Gaudí shows one of the lampposts under construction in the workshop of Matamala at 10 Carrer de la Cendra. The project originally foresaw four lampposts around the fountain, but budget limits reduced the number to two.

== Description ==
Each lamppost stands about three metres high on a marble plinth about one metre tall. A cast iron column, whose profile follows a type devised by Eugène Viollet-le-Duc, rises from a large iron medallion with floral motifs on the base. It carries six arms, set at different heights so that the light globes do not crowd one another, and each ended in a gas lantern fitted with an inner cap of white opal glass to reflect the light. The shaft bears the coat of arms of Barcelona, medallions with a six pointed star and the Catalan bars. The top is a winged helmet over two coiled serpents, the attributes of Mercury. In his report Gaudí gave a practical reason for choosing the caduceus as the finial:

...a form that moreover lends itself perfectly to being raised in metal, whose reflections would prevent the outlines from being seen well, resulting in indecisive forms that will be made precise by the greater ornamentation in the upper part of the candelabrum.

— Antoni Gaudí, Candelabro. Apuntes descriptivos (1878)

The lampposts were polychrome, and Gaudí's report described the scheme in detail:

The caduceus will be gilded with black enamels, the two serpents that support it will have their scales in gold and blue, and their tongues will stand out gilded, with red glints, because their jaws are red. [...] The upper part of the arms, to avoid the intense reflections that the metal would produce in the sun's rays, will be red with gilded stripes.

— Antoni Gaudí, Candelabro. Apuntes descriptivos (1878)

A newspaper description from the inauguration says the ironwork was painted in dark and red tones with gilded parts.

Despite their classical and mythological references, the lampposts are placed in the eclectic style of the 1870s and 1880s in Barcelona, rather than showing the personal manner of Gaudí's mature work.

== Installation and reception ==
The two lampposts were put in place on 24 September 1879, during the Mercè festivities, facing the Passatge Colom, one on each side of the fountain. El Correo Catalán described them as formidable warriors about three metres tall. The Diario de Barcelona was more critical, finding them too robust and saying they looked as if made of wood rather than iron. On 27 September the satirical weekly La Esquella de la Torratxa printed a caricature on its front page showing the two lamps as soldiers talking beside the Three Graces. The company that ran the gas lighting of Barcelona later refused to maintain them, arguing that the glass of the lantern tops could not withstand the heat of the flames.

== Interpretation ==
The art historian Antonio Sama has argued that the lampposts carry a second, concealed reading beyond their function and the commercial symbolism stated in Gaudí's report. In his analysis the helmet is not a simple Mercury cap but a war helmet topped by a bird that he identifies as a phoenix, so that each lamppost reads as a warrior figure with arms like gauntleted forearms. He sees in this an allegory of the Renaixença that combines Mercury, associated with trade and peace, and Minerva, associated with war and the arts. Sama relates the phoenix to a similar bird on the coat of arms at the Palau Güell and to the emblem of the Catalanist newspaper La Renaixensa.

Gaudí's own report presented the lampposts as functional and symbolic, and described the finial as their most important ornamental element:

The part of true ornamental importance is the finial of the support, whose form synthesises the tradition and history of Barcelona. [...] The historical memories of all ages, the view of the present and the hope for the future, wishing to condense them in an explicit and clear way, [...] it has seemed fitting to us, being intelligible, to finish the most important part of the candelabrum with the winged caduceus of Mercury.

— Antoni Gaudí, Candelabro. Apuntes descriptivos (1878)

== Restoration ==
By 1965 the lampposts had been restored, a restoration that the critic E. Casanelles described as very poor. In May 1967 the technical services of the city council were restoring several works by Gaudí as part of the events held in his honour, among them the lampposts of Plaça Reial. According to Cèsar Martinell, before the restoration they were blackened by paint and neglect, and the municipality was advised by the Centro de Estudios Gaudinistas. By September 1969 the polychromy had been restored, with the coat of arms of the city in heraldic colours, the caduceus gilded with black enamels, the serpents with gold and blue scales and gilded tongues with red details, and the six arms red with gilded stripes. Martinell explained how this was possible:

[...] the polychromy which, though entirely vanished, could be recreated thanks to the precision with which Gaudí described it in the report that accompanied the project.

— César Martinell, La Vanguardia (17 September 1969)

A further restoration shortly before 2006 brought back the gold tones of the lampposts.

== Pla del Palau lampposts ==
The favourable reception of the prototype led to a further commission of four lampposts, for the Pla del Palau and the entrance to La Barceloneta. The order reached Gaudí on 22 February 1879. The council then cut the budget, arguing that these locations did not need the luxury of Plaça Reial, so the helmet and three of the six lights were dropped. Gaudí capped the shaft instead with an inverted crown of serpents, which Sama connects with Gothic Catalan candelabra preserved in the Cau Ferrat in Sitges. The Fundación Antoni Gaudí describes the decoration of the three armed lamps as two lizards in place of the serpents. The lamps were finished in May 1880 and inaugurated on 25 September 1880, when the Diario de Barcelona noted that the crown turned into a "crown of light" at night. Two of them still stand in the Pla del Palau, and the two made for La Barceloneta have disappeared. According to the Fundación Antoni Gaudí, the latter stood on the Passeig Nacional, today Passeig de Joan de Borbó. A frequently repeated date of 1890 for the Pla del Palau lamps seems to derive from a misprint in a 1967 study by Cèsar Martinell.

== Other lamppost projects ==
Gaudí also designed a scheme of lamps for the Muralla del Mar in Barcelona, which was never built.

== Recognition ==
The lampposts are included among the 14 basic works by Gaudí that can be visited in Barcelona, and are dated to 1878 and described as an early work, in a guide published by Barcelona Turisme. A route published for the 150th anniversary of the birth of Gaudí in 2002 presented them as part of a walk through his Barcelona, and an article marking the centenary of his death in 2026 lists them among his works.
