= Royal Square (Barcelona) =

Square in Barcelona, Spain

Coordinates: 41.380°N 2.175°E

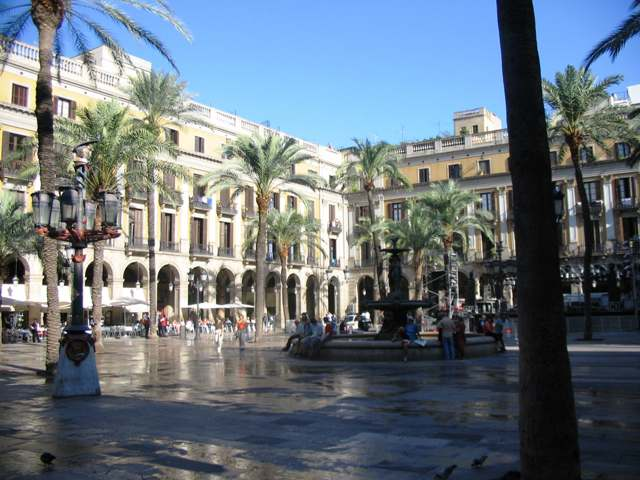
Royal Square.

The Royal Square (in Spanish: Plaza Real; in Catalan: Plaça Reial) is a square in the Barri Gòtic of Barcelona, Catalonia, Spain. It is close to La Rambla, and is a popular tourist attraction, especially at night. The plaza hosts many restaurants and some of the city's most famous nightclubs, including Sidecar, Jamboree, Karma and the historic and reinvented speakeasy cocktail bar Nou Pipa Club. The square is the site of the Hotel Roma Reial and is also known for its many outdoor venues. It is a popular meeting place in the summer, during the annual La Mercè festival in September when open-air concerts take place, and during other celebrations such as New Year's Eve.

The original building on the site was the Capuchin convent of Santa Madrona, which was demolished in 1835. Royal Square was then designed by Francesc Daniel Molina i Casamajó later in the 19th century. The square is twinned with Plaza Garibaldi, in Mexico City.

The square's lampposts were designed by the Catalan architect Antoni Gaudí in 1878 and installed in 1879.

== Transport ==
- Barcelona Metro - Liceu (on L3)

== See also ==
- Street names in Barcelona
- Urban planning of Barcelona
