= Antoni Rovira i Trias =

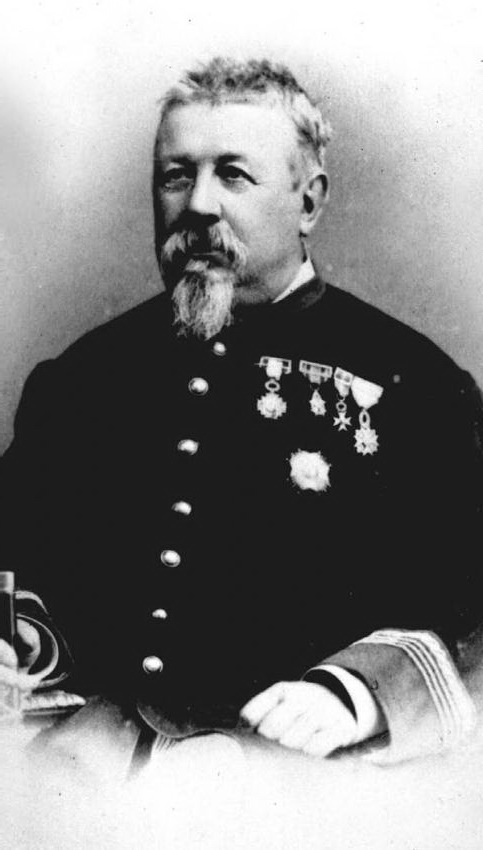
Antoni Rovira i Trias

Antoni Rovira i Trias (1816 in Barcelona – 1889 in Barcelona) was a Catalan architect, urban planner and founder of several associations, among them Societat Filomàtica de Barcelona. He is known as the architect of several buildings in Barcelona, among them the markets of Barceloneta (1873), La Concepció (1885; on career d'Aragó), El Born (1876) and Sant Antoni (1879). He is also responsible for the Passatge del Comerç (1855), Teatre Circ Barcelonès (1853) and the construction of the loggia of Palau Moja (1856) and, vital to the development of the city, the demolition of the Ciutadella, the 18th-century military citadel.

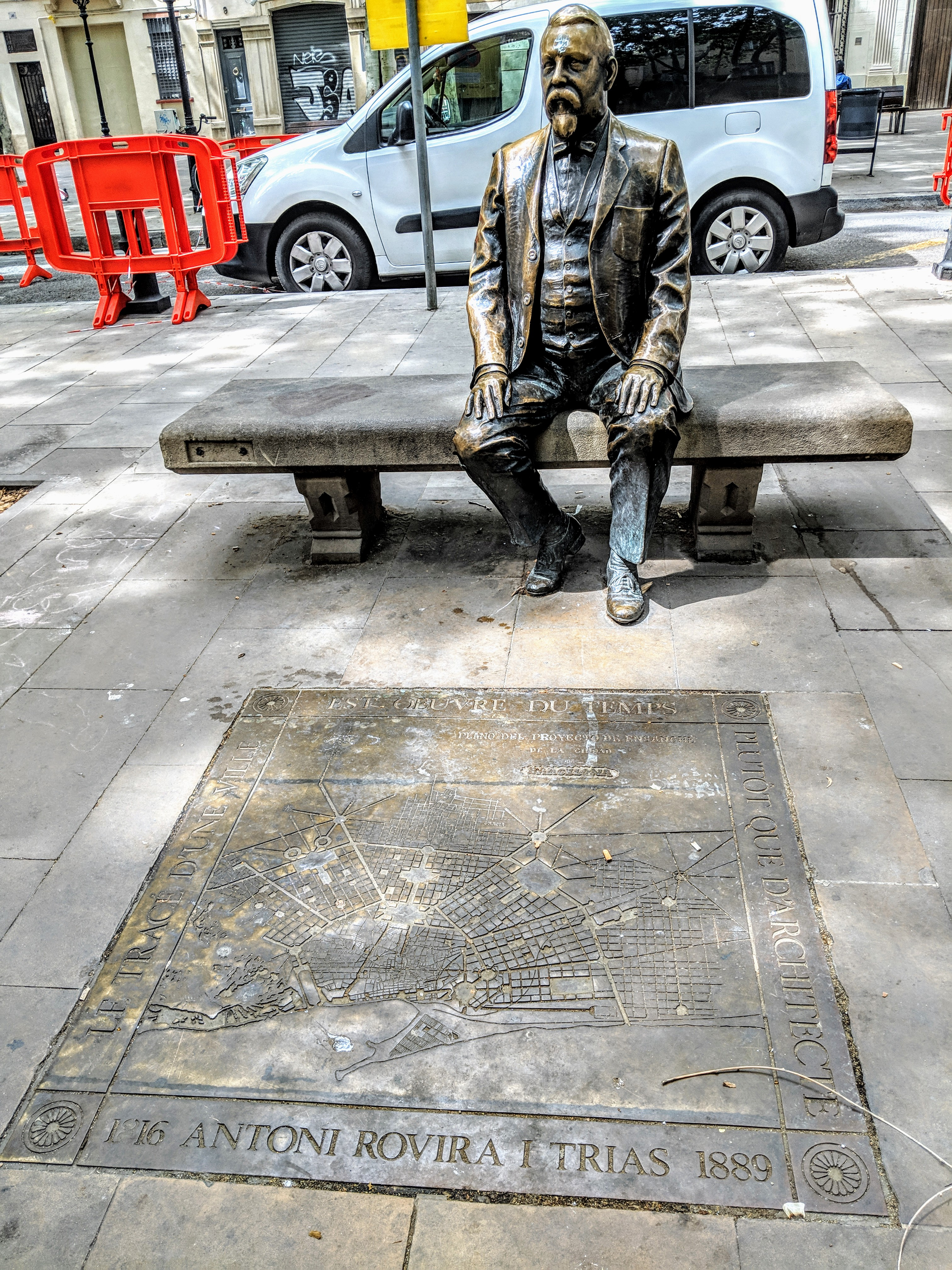
Monument at Plaça de Rovira i Trias, in Gràcia, Barcelona.

His radial urban plan for Barcelona, under the name Le tracé d’une ville est oeuvre du temps plutôt que d’architecte rivalled with Ildefons Cerdà's, and won the 1859 municipal contest by city council's decree, but the central Spanish government in Madrid favoured Cerdà's over his, and construction started the following year. Eventually, however, Cerdà's plan would remain unfulfilled. Rovira's plan, and to a large degree himself too, were long forgotten until recently, when a book was published focusing on Rovira's egalitarian approach to urban planning, and small but meaningful details for which he was responsible.

== See also ==
- Eixample
- Urban planning of Barcelona
