= Josep Fontserè i Mestre =

Catalan architect

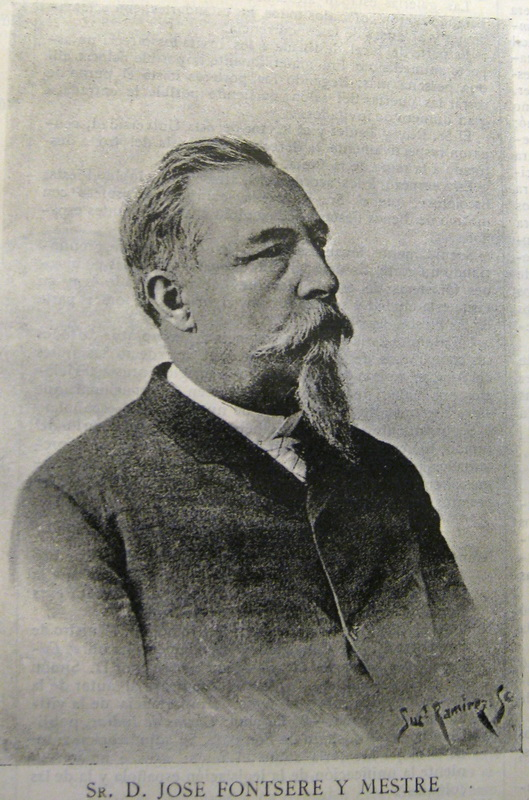
Josep Fontserè.

Josep Fontserè i Mestre (1829 - 15 May 1897) was a Spanish Catalan architect.
