= Street furniture in Barcelona =

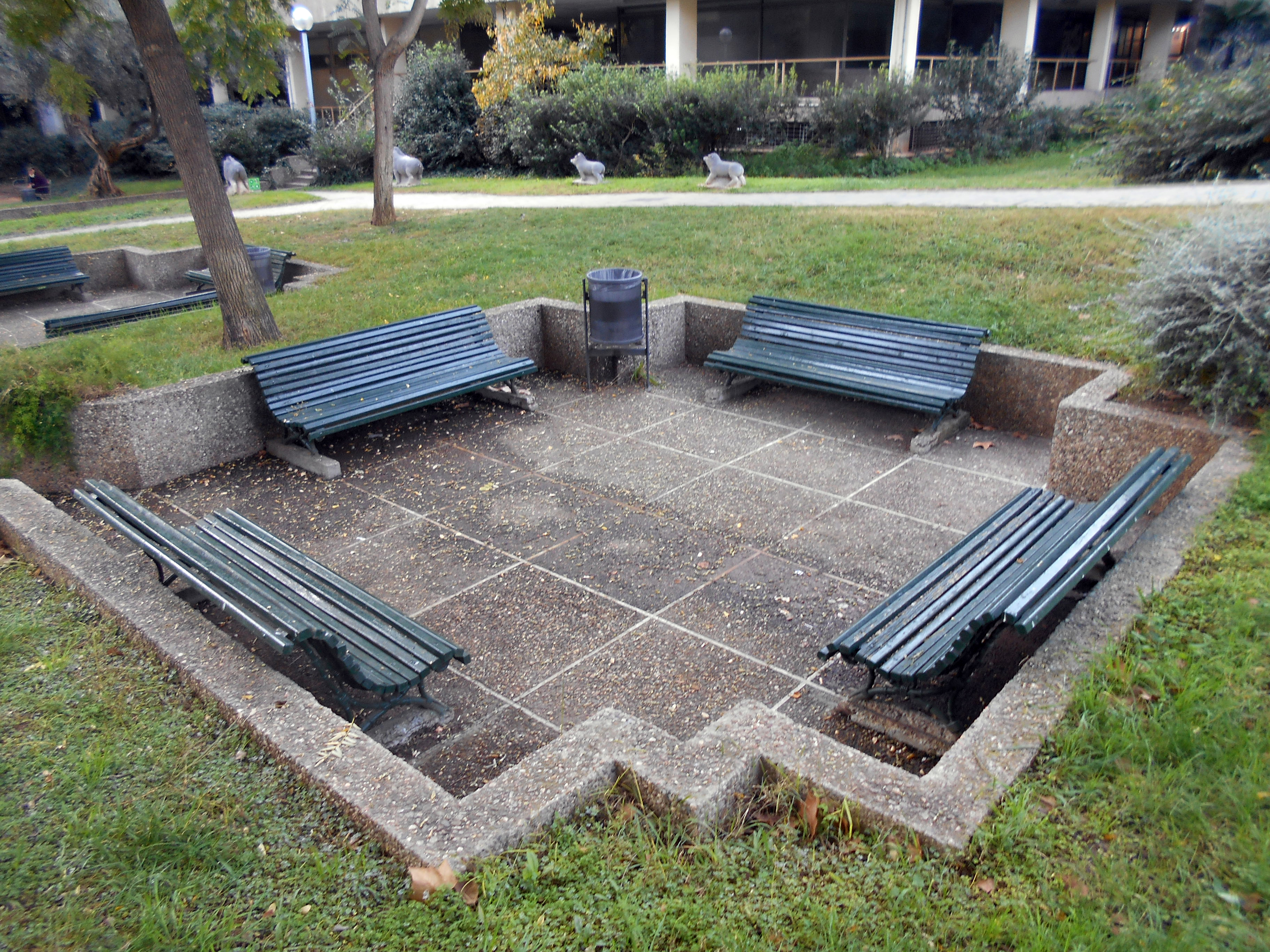
Romantic model benches in the Jardins de Jaume Vicens i Vives

The street furniture in Barcelona is managed by the Department of Ecology, Urban Planning and Mobility of the City Council of Barcelona. It developed in accordance with the progress made in urban planning of Barcelona as a whole and, in general, with the historical and territorial evolution of the city, and in line with other defining factors of public space such as architecture, urban infrastructures and the adaptation and maintenance of natural or construction spaces. Although their main characteristic has always been functionality, as a general rule they have often been objects of design and aesthetic consideration, since they furnish the public space where urban society develops.

The urban evolution of Barcelona has been constant since its foundation in Ancient Rome to the present day, although it has been since the 19th century when it was accentuated thanks to the Cerdà Plan and the aggregation of neighboring municipalities. It was also by the end of that century when the street furniture began to have a special consideration and to be the object of design and planning, thanks to the work of the successive people in charge of Buildings and Ornamentation of the City Council such as Antoni Rovira i Trias and Pere Falqués i Urpí.

It encompasses a series of elements for the urban management of the city and the planning and execution of all the factors related to the adaptability of the physical environment to human life and the development of society, such as street light, benches, waste container, post boxes, fountains, traffic lights, public transport stops, pavement, flower boxes, kiosks, parking meters, payphone among many other objects and elements of micro-architecture.

== Urban elements ==
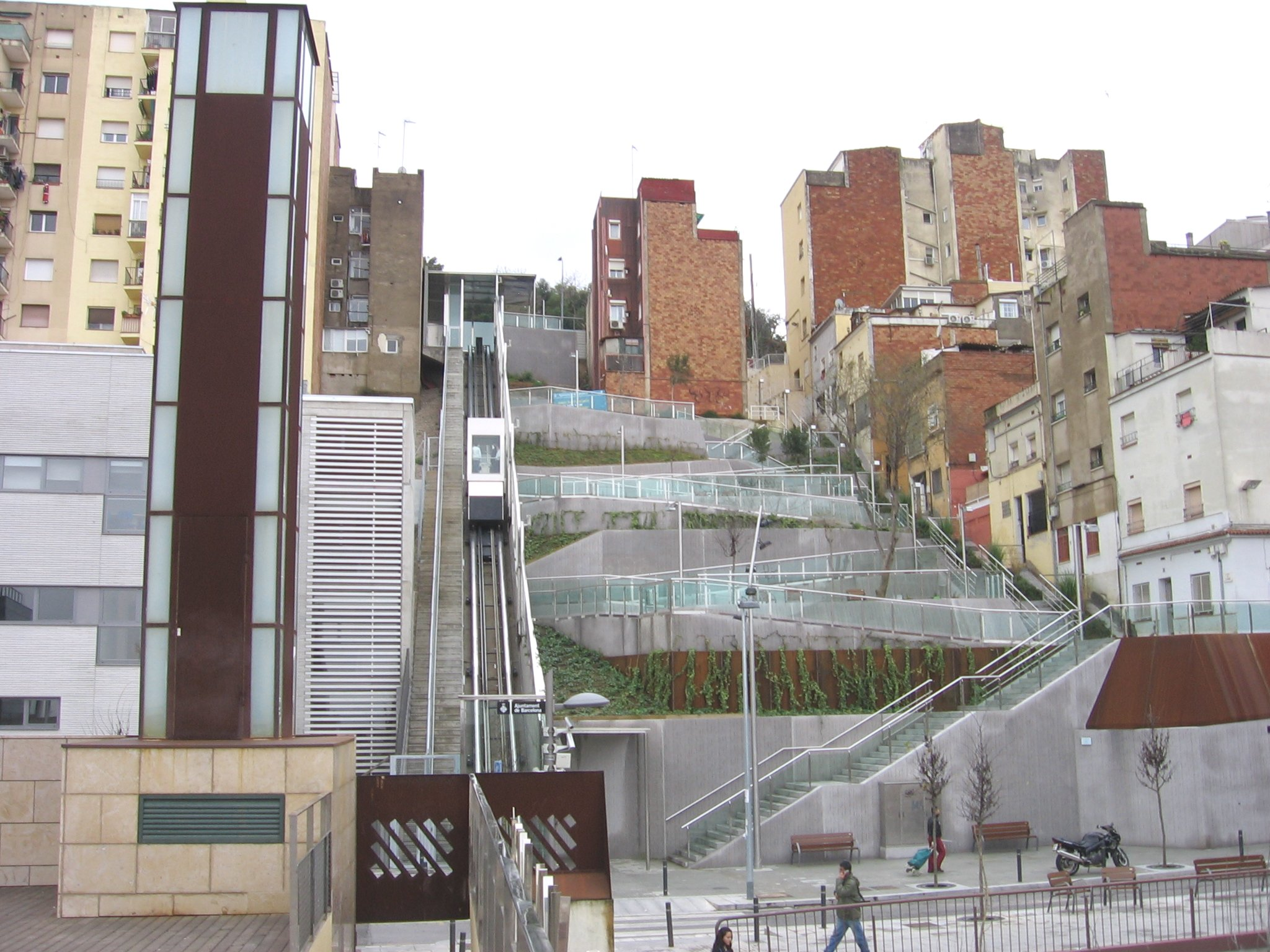
Funicular elevator in Alguer Street, in the El Carmel neighborhood.

Barcelona has an area of 102.16 km^{2}, 25.7% of which is public space (16.3% streets and the rest are green areas). In 2009, there were 703,540 urban elements in Barcelona's public spaces, one for every 8 m^{2} of sidewalk.

As a general rule, urban elements must meet certain criteria: design, based on aesthetic quality, authenticity and originality; functionality and ergonomics; easy maintenance and low cost; accessibility and safety; and social and environmental sustainability. For their installation and maintenance, a study must be made of the terrain and social needs, which is usually based on pre-established municipal regulations. Depending on the element to be installed, the ideal material must be studied (the most commonly used are wood, stone, concrete, metal, glass and plastic), its resistance, its maintenance –one factor to take into account is vandalism–, its placement and its use. Other factors that have been considered in recent times have been sustainability and multi-functionality. Its economic cost should also be considered in terms of its technical characteristics, the investment-amortization ratio, its purchase and manufacturing cost, its assembly and installation, its maintenance and its consumption of water, gas or electricity. Finally, a factor to take into account is its accessibility and ease of use, especially in consideration of people with reduced mobility or some type of physical or sensory disability.

There is a wide variety of urban elements, which can be classified according to their function:

Common urbanization elements:

- Pavement: this is the floor covering, which can be made of stone, mortar, concrete, macadam or asphalt, with various models, such as 4 or 9 lozenges, flowers, roses, circles, concentric rings, bars, diagonal macaroni, Gaudi, etc.
- Curbs: separating barriers between sidewalk and roadway, made of stone or concrete. The most common are manual, mechanized granite and granite scuppers.
- Fords: spaces for pedestrian traffic (ford boat or depressed sidewalk) or vehicles (models V-20 and V-40/60).
- Tree grate: these are tree delimiting elements, made of concrete, iron or steel, with various models: Brico, Fiol, Ramla, Yarg or Carmel 160.
- Grates: they are used for the evacuation of rainwater from the ground to the sewers. They are generally made of iron, with models such as Ciutat Vella, Delta-BCN or Meridiana 30.
- Covers and manholes: these are the sewer and infrastructure closure elements (water, electricity, gas, telecommunications), usually made of cast iron.
- Stairs, ramps, elevators and escalators: these are used to bridge differences in level and can be made of stone or mechanized elements.
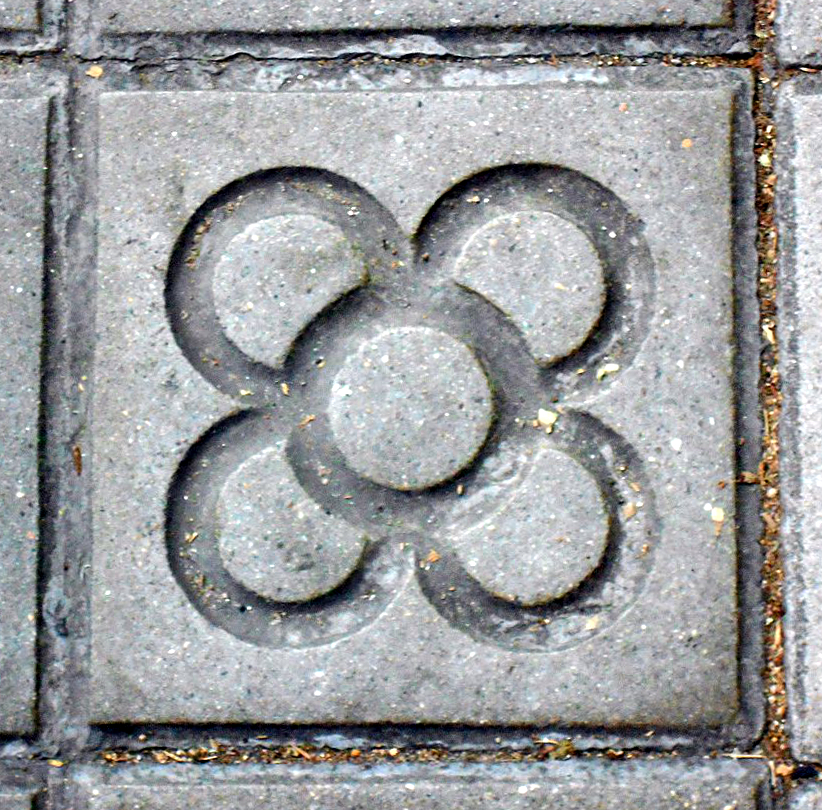
Pavement: "Flor de Barcelona", Josep Puig i Cadafalch.

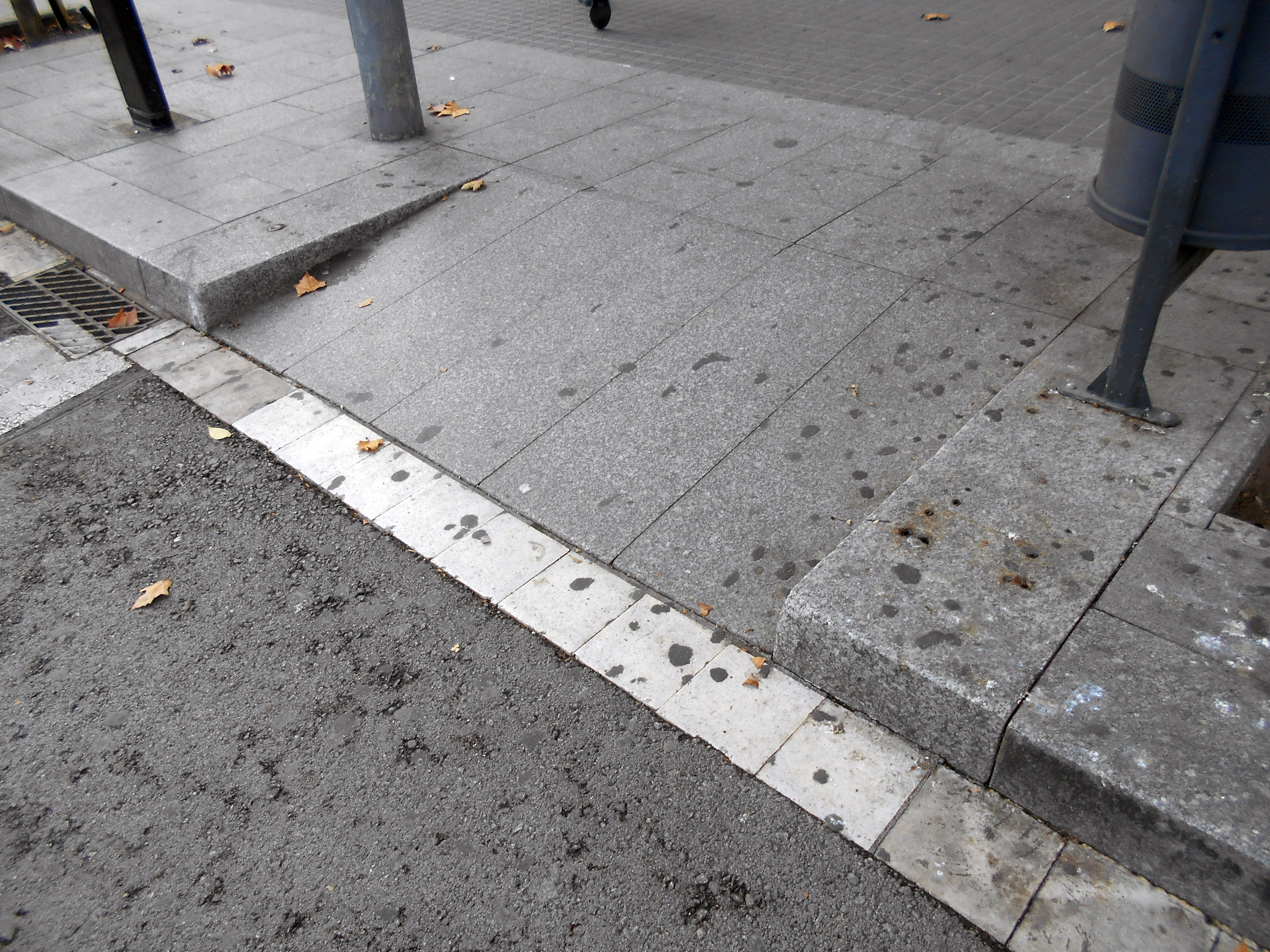
Ford.

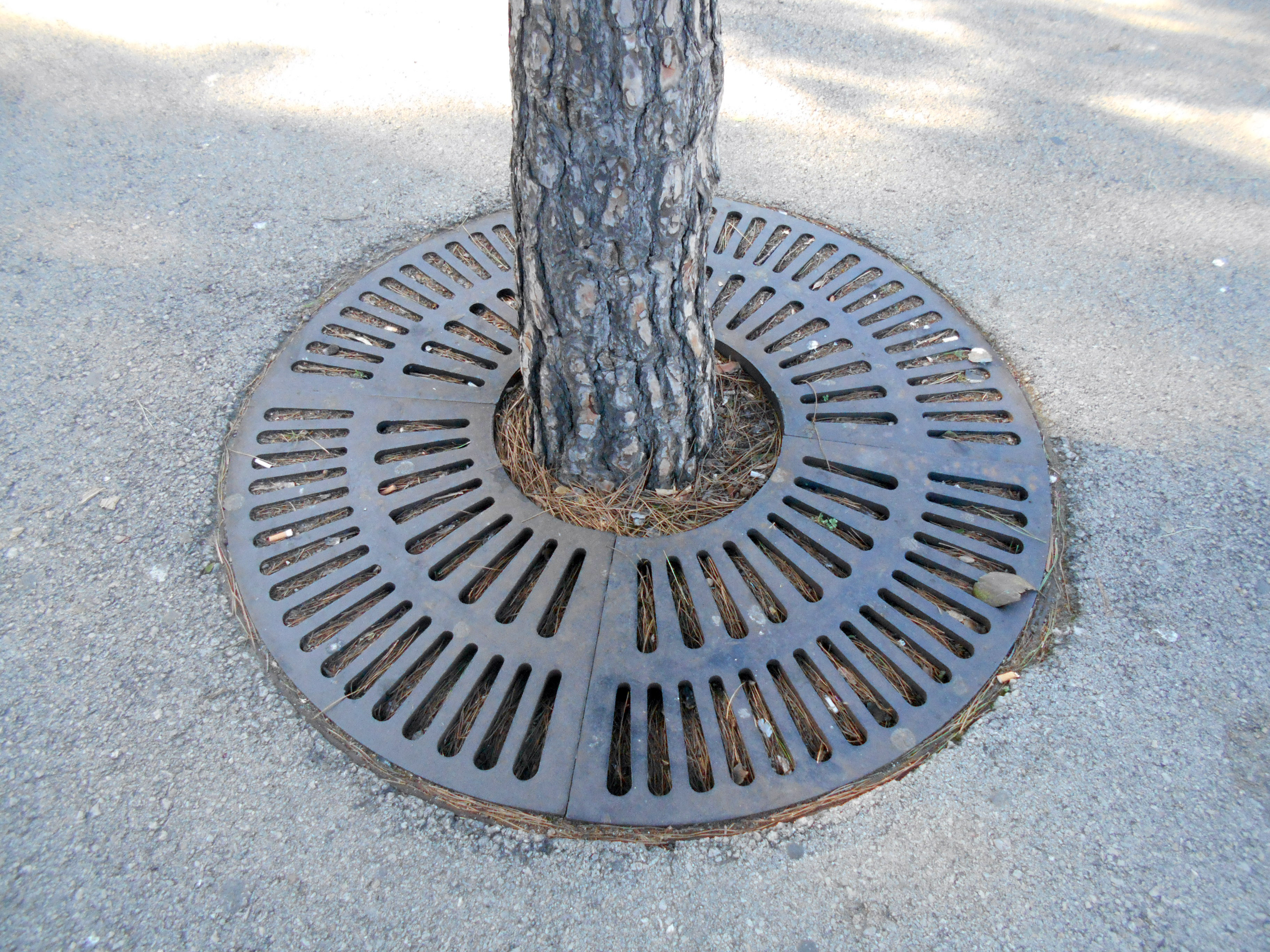
Tree grate.

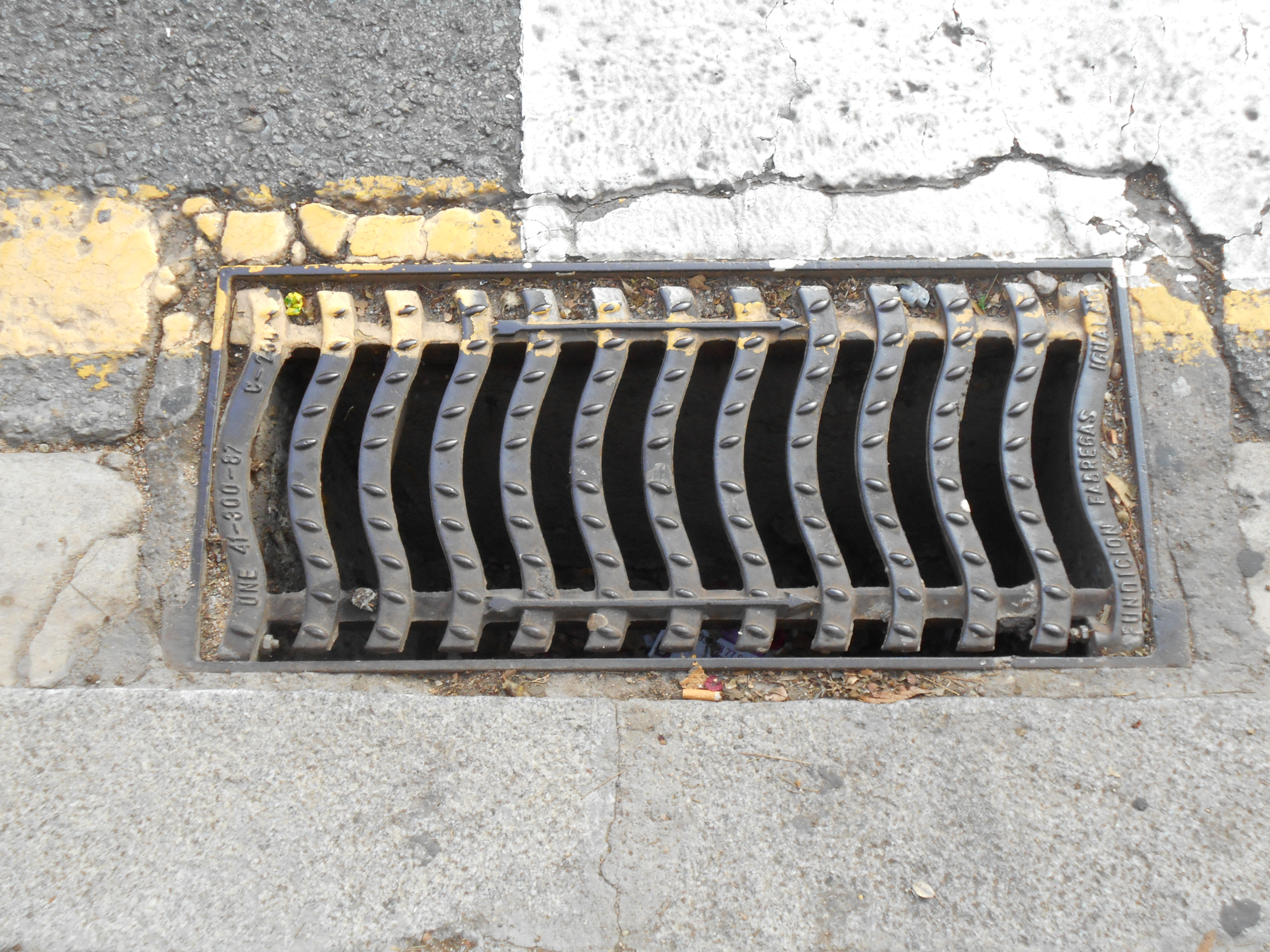
Grille.

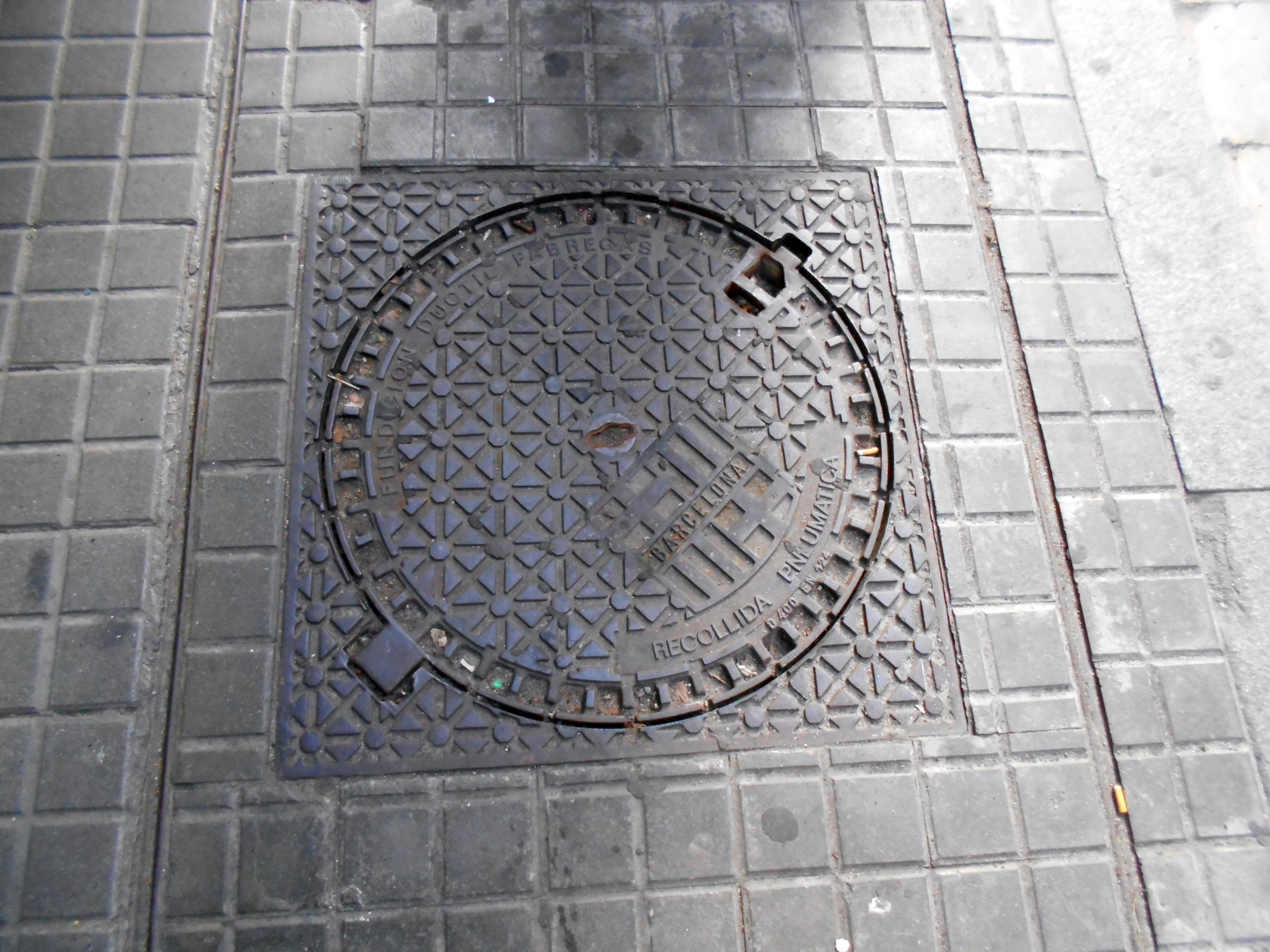
Manholes.

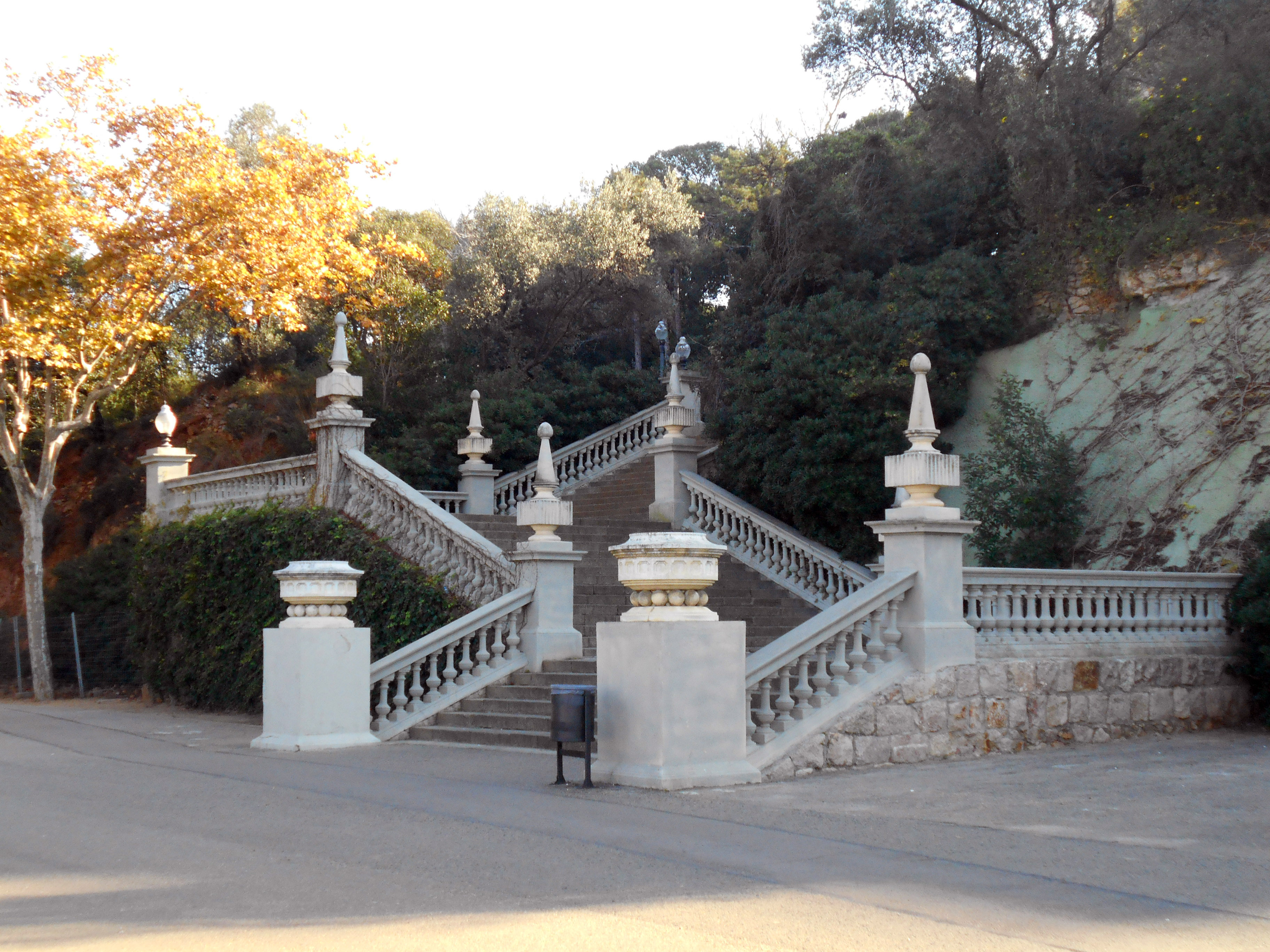
Stairs of the Jean C.N. Forestier promenade.

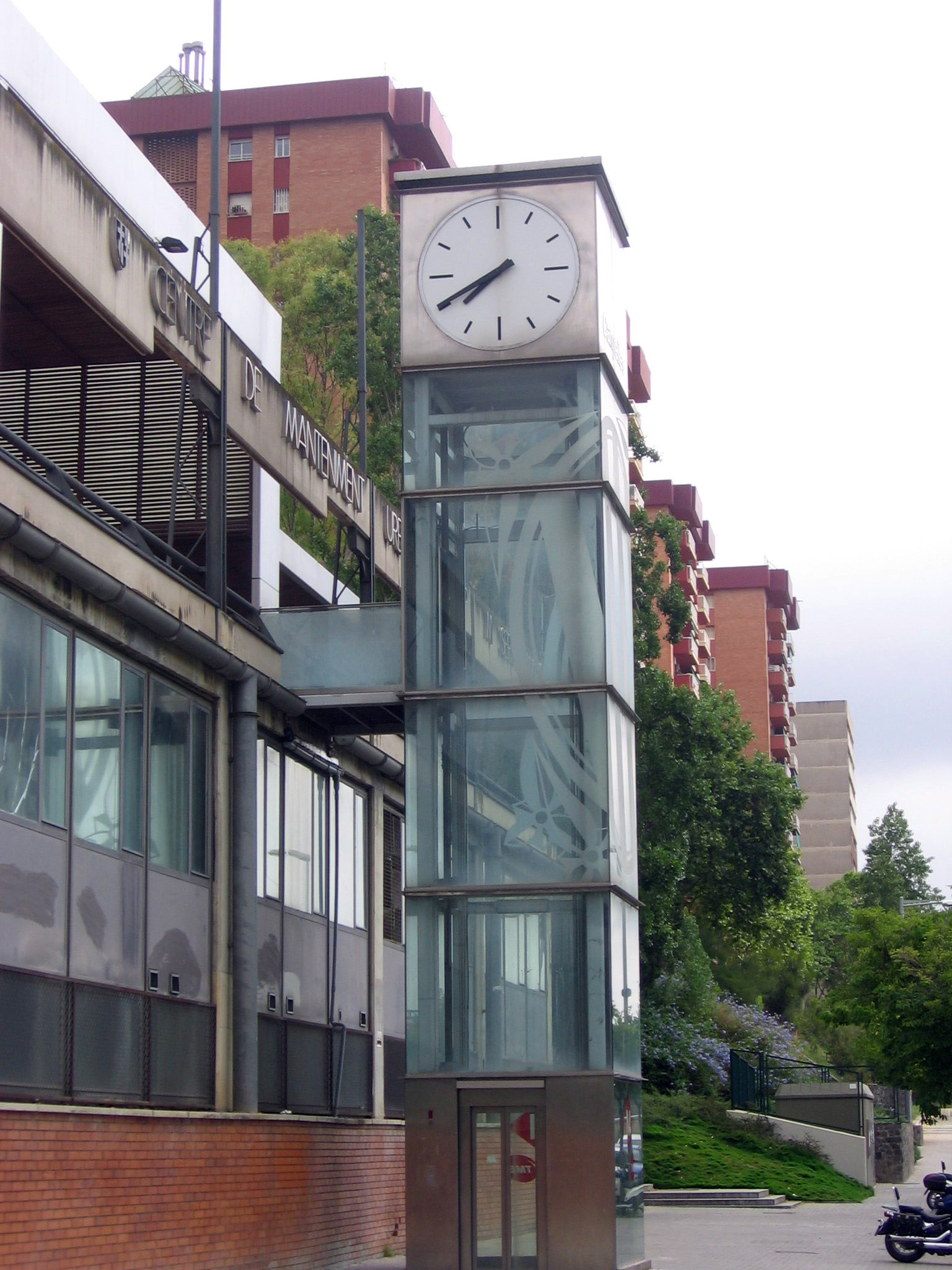
Via Favencia elevator with clock.

Elements for pedestrian protection:

- Guard rail: they serve to delimit spaces and act as handrails and parapets; they are generally made of steel, with models such as Line, V or INOX 50/25.
- Bollard, pylon or milestone: these are barriers to prevent vehicle access to pedestrian areas; they can be fixed, retractable or automated. The main models are Ciutat Vella, Barcelona, Universal, Gorge, Via Júlia, Sant Feliu and Esquirol.
- Green space boundaries: they are used to delimit flowerbeds and spaces dedicated to gardening and are usually made of stone or steel and measure 20 or 30 cm in height.
- Barriers and fences: these are provisional elements for protection or to prevent passage, and can be fixed or portable, made of plastic or steel.

Signaling:

- Banner sign: indicates certain establishments, such as parking lots; they may project from the facade or be cantilevered on a pole.
- Street signs: used to indicate the name of the street, on marble plaques fixed to the wall or on steel plate or phenolic resin signs on a pole.
- Route markers: used to indicate the direction, on steel or aluminum plates.
- Traffic signs: indicate road regulation symbols, with or without illuminated signs.
- Information on road works or pavement markings: such as guides for the blind, bike path, tree identification plaques or Modernism Route tiles.
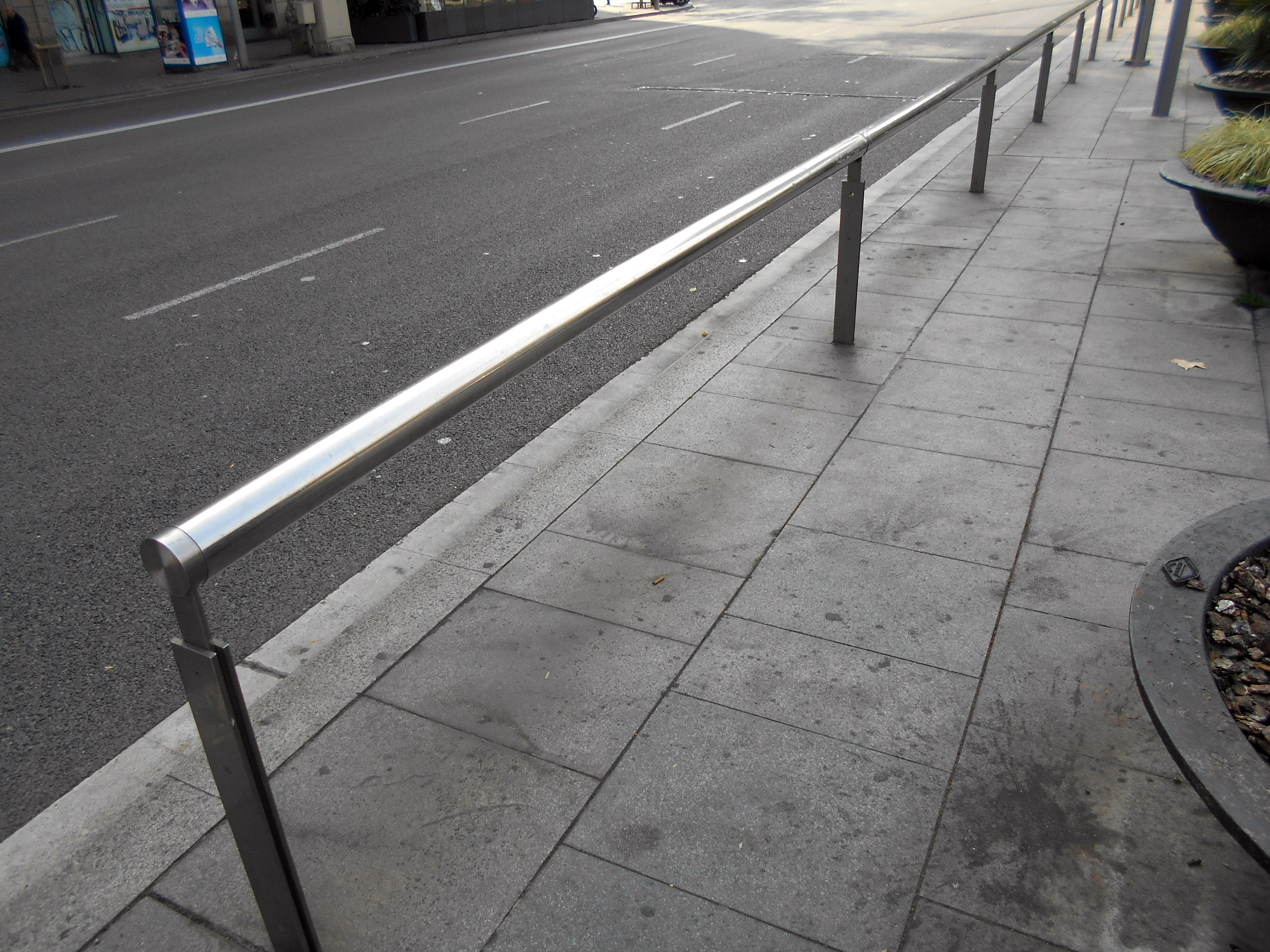
Guardrail.

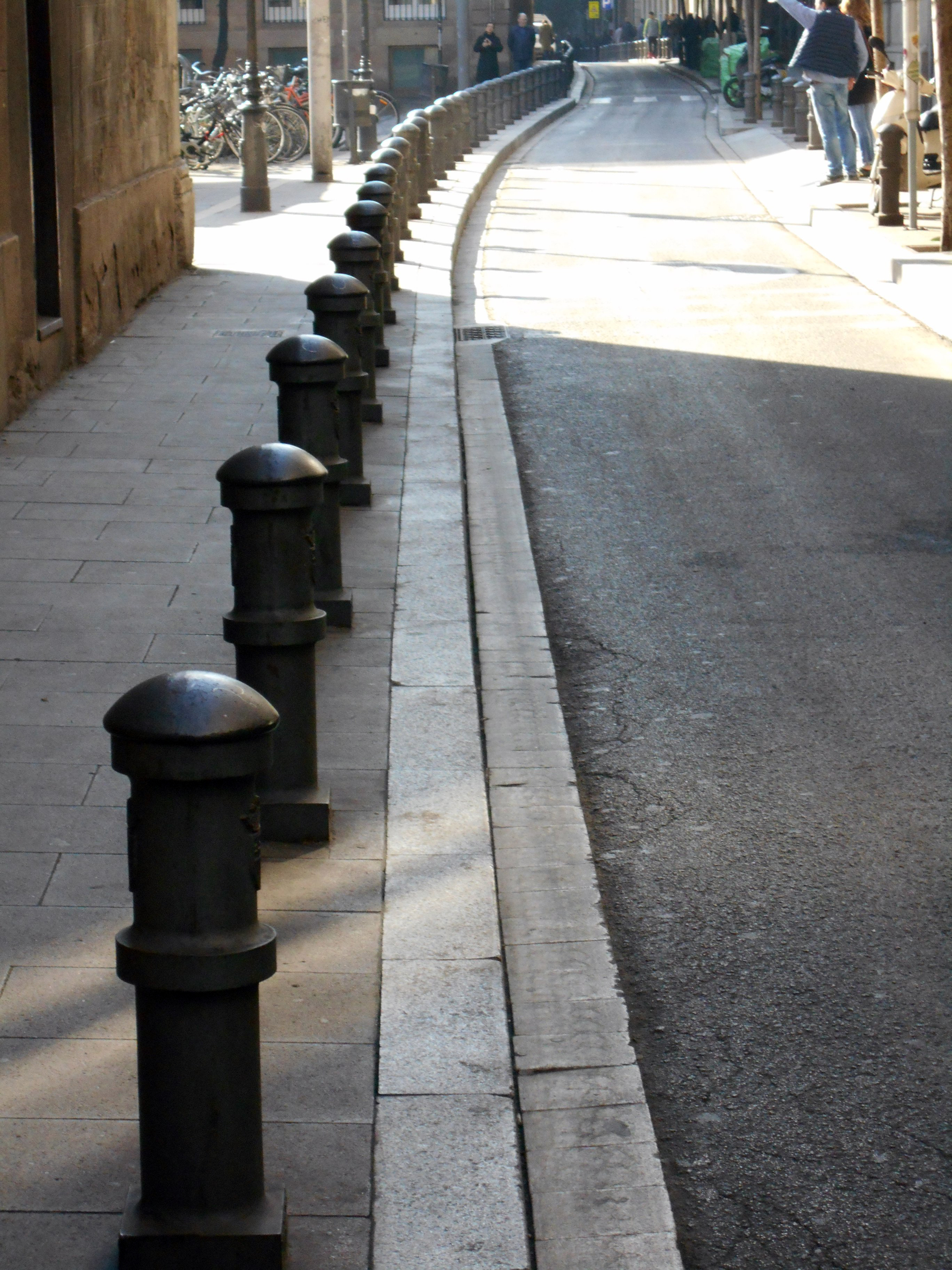
Bollards.

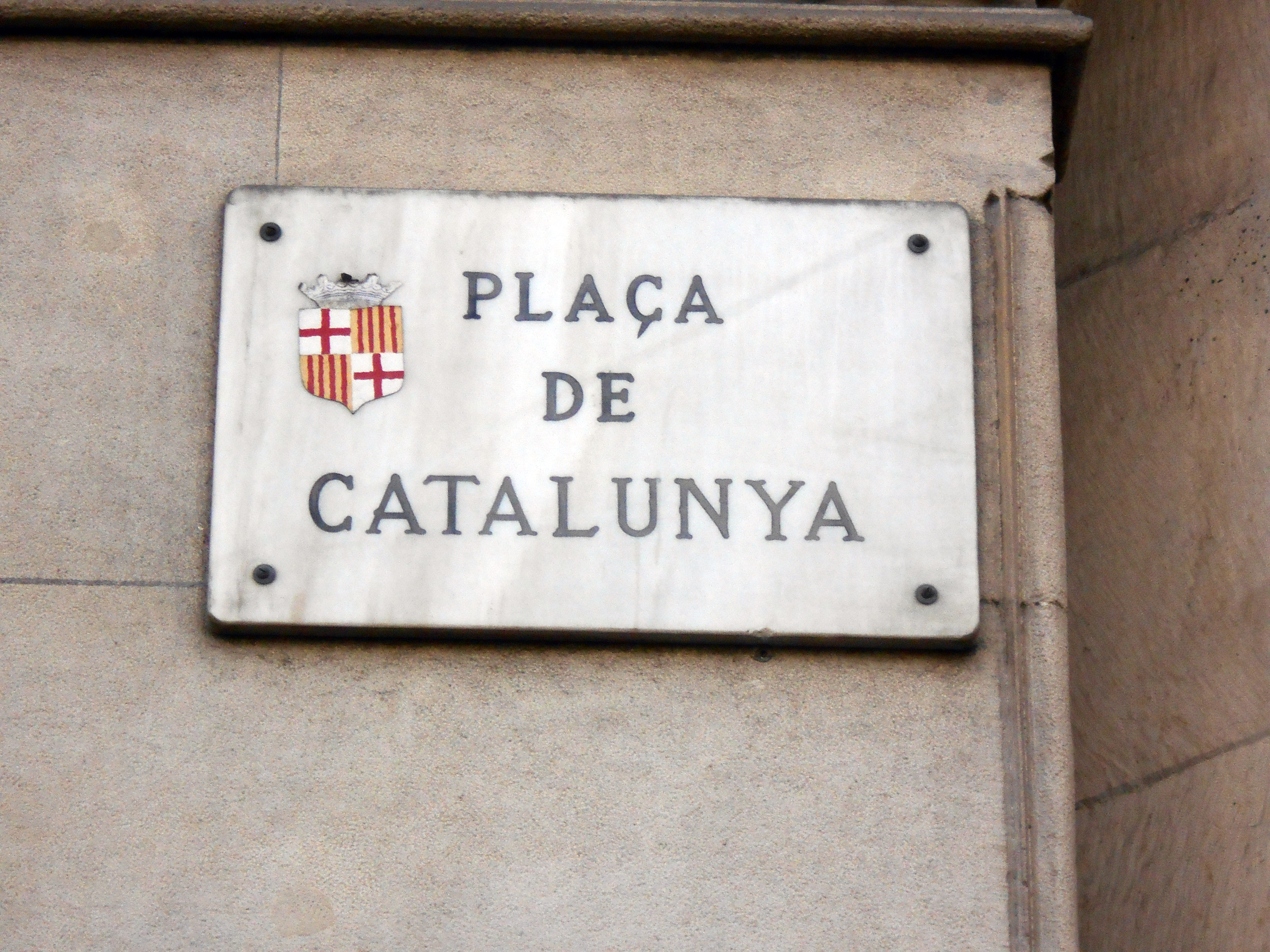
Plaça de Catalunya sign.

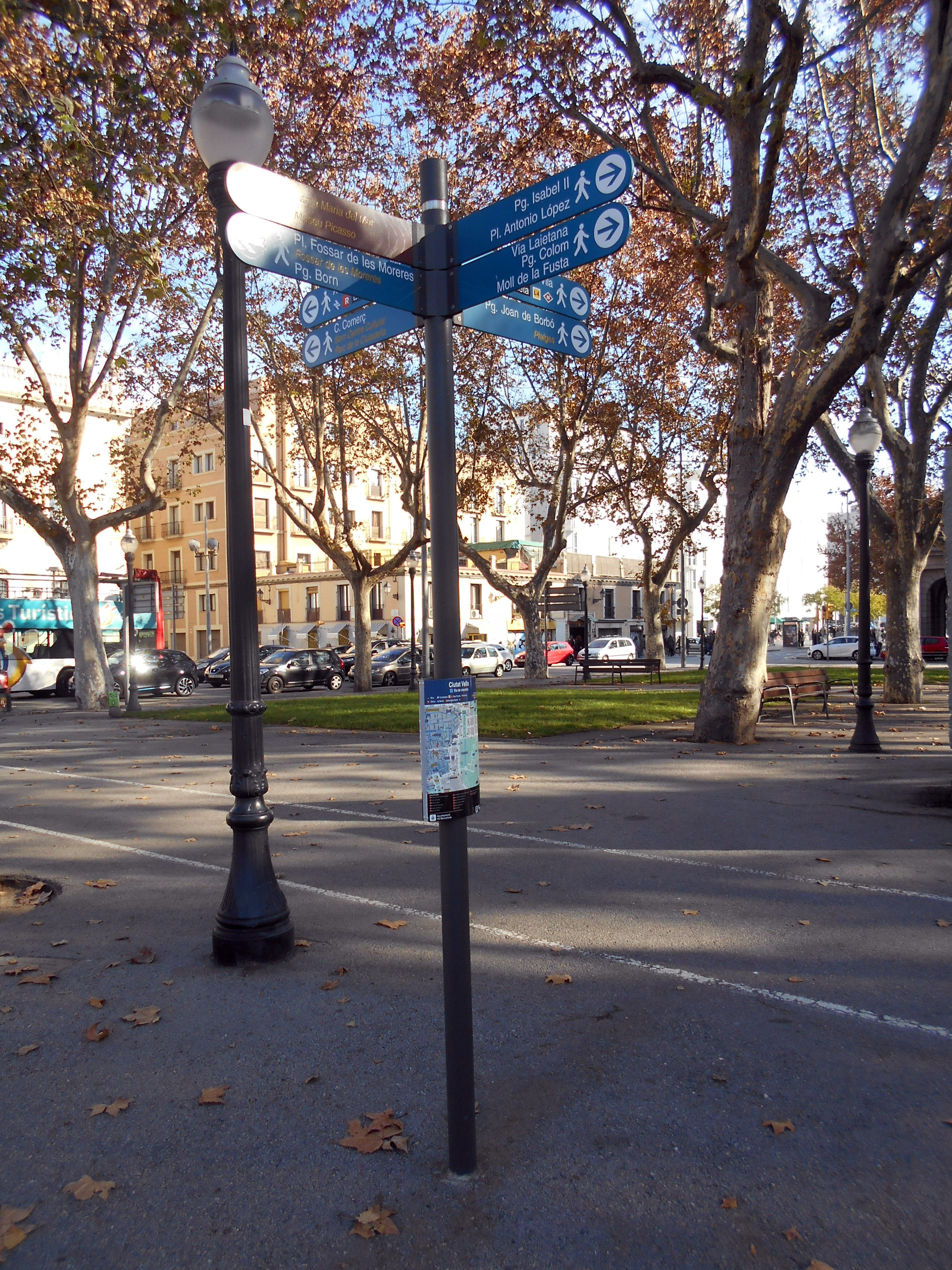
Itinerary indicator.

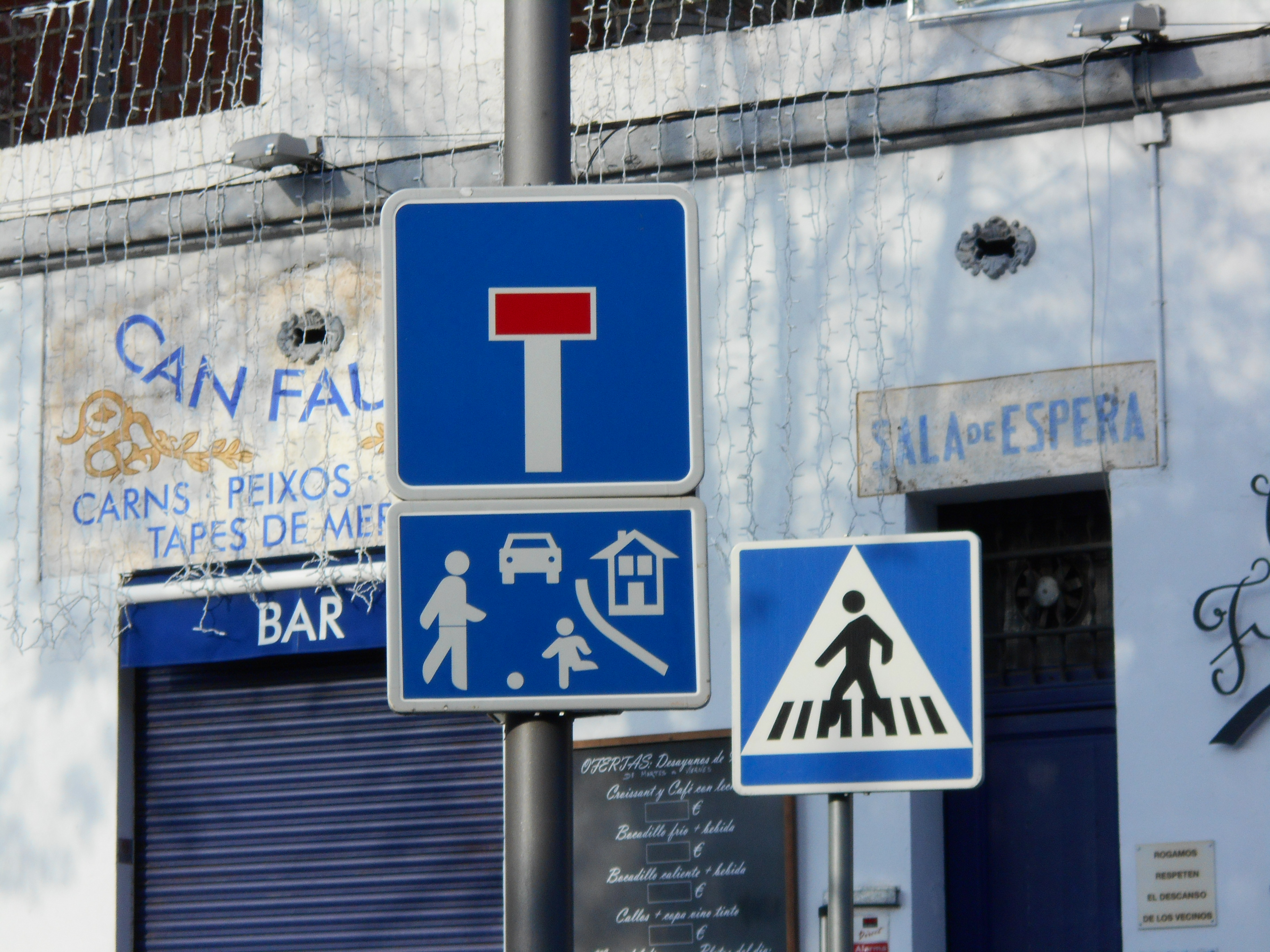
Traffic signs.

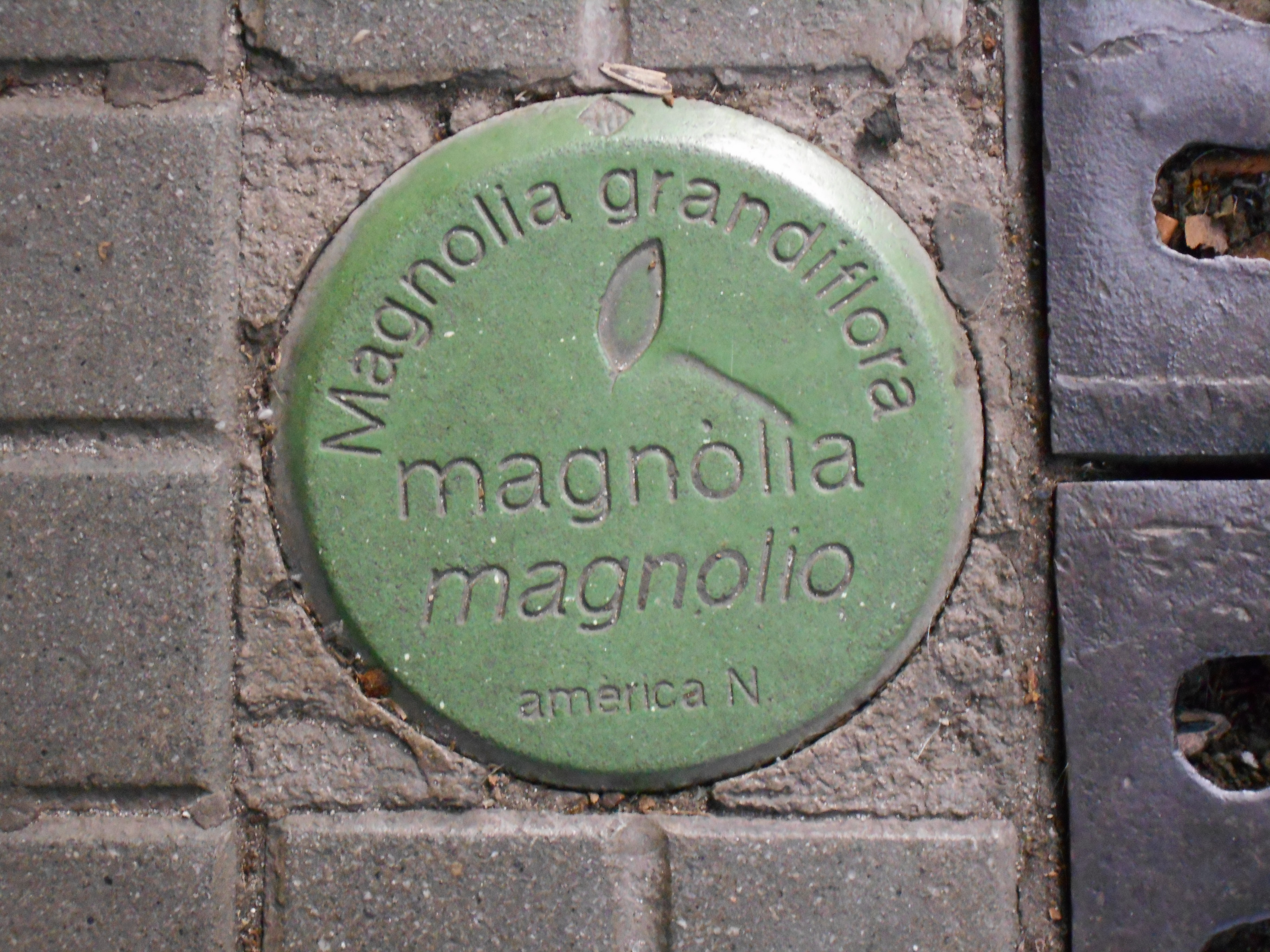
Tree identification plaque.

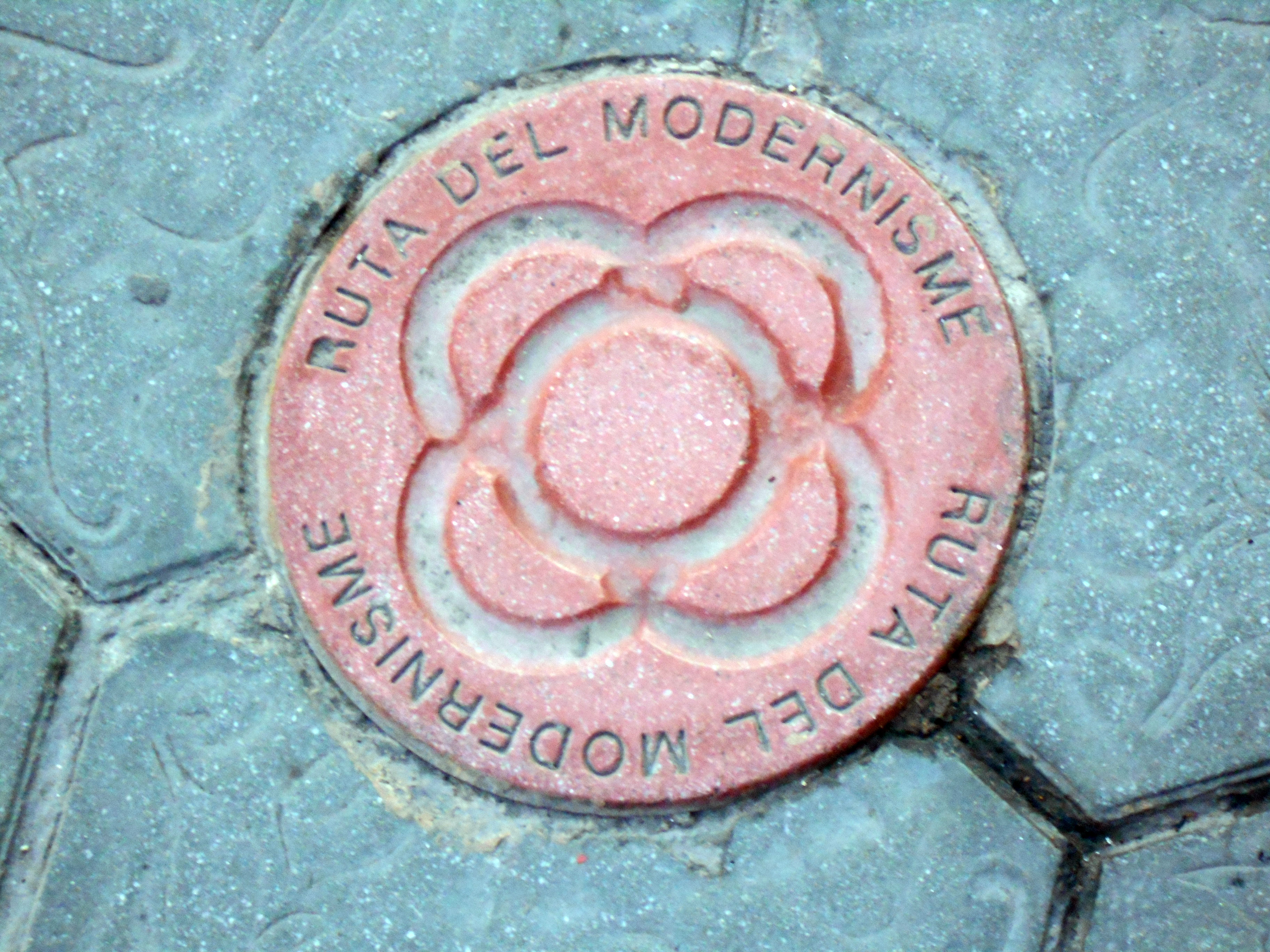
Tile of the Modernism Route.

Lighting and traffic control:

- Street light: these can be wall-mounted lanterns, floor street lights or chandeliers. The main models are Lamparaalta, Eixample, Alguer, Lampelunas, Línia Z, Plus, Roma, Andrea, Pagode, Venus and Galdana.
- Lighting columns: these are vertical elements of between 6 and 16 m that incorporate lamps in their upper part; the most common models are: Kanya, Pep, Micra, Pechina, Stick, C.S.V., Prim, Nikolson, Ful and Nou Barris.
- Poles: these are curved lighting columns, with models such as BC1, Arco, Pelai, Gran Via, Paral·lel and 22@.
- Beacons, wall lights (suspended or recessed in floors or walls), floor switches and floodlights.
- Traffic lights: serve to regulate traffic, and can be bulb or LED; some have an acoustic signal for the blind.
- Installation cabinets: these are technical support panels for traffic lights and other electronic elements.
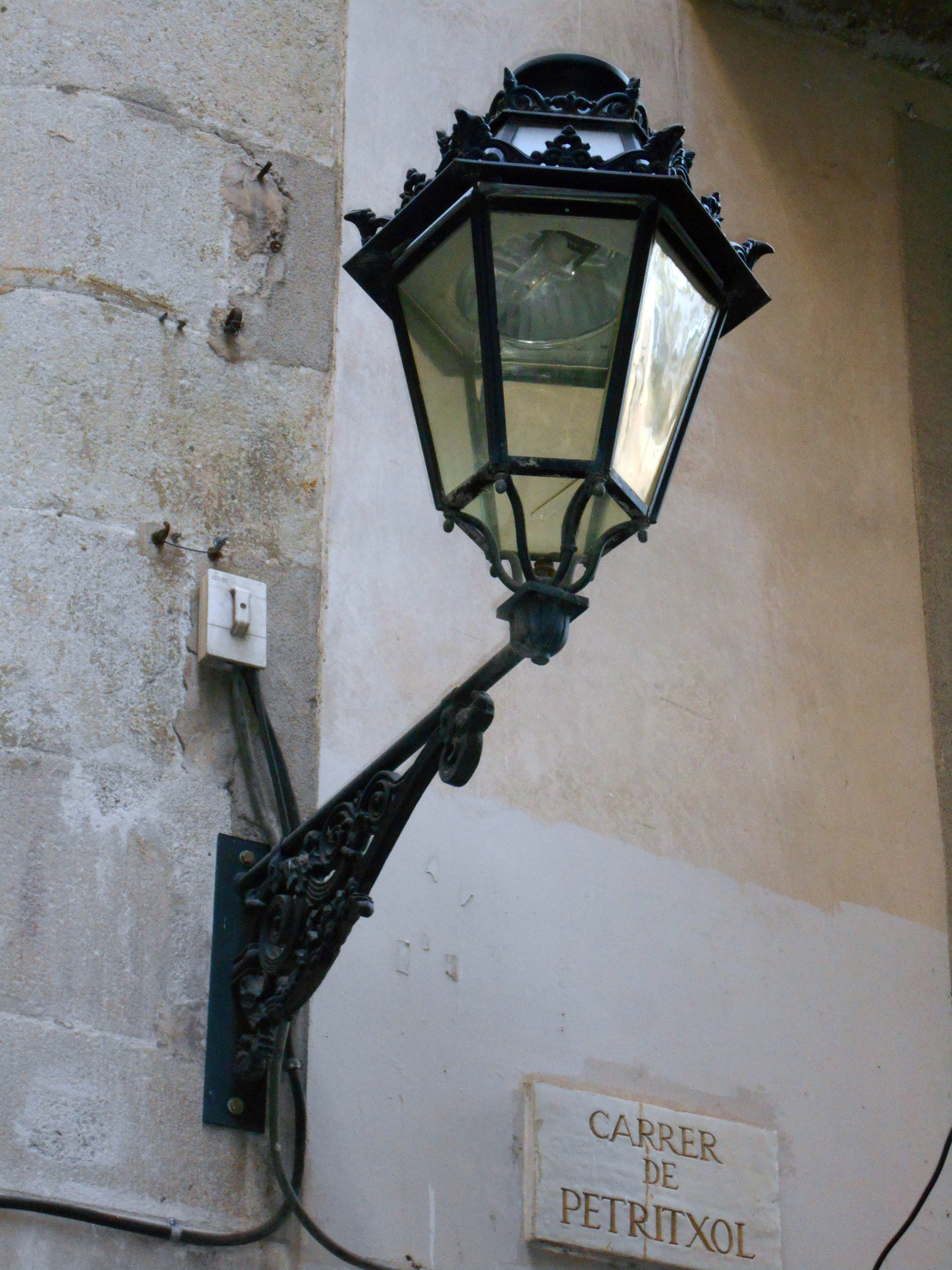
Wall lantern, Petritxol street.

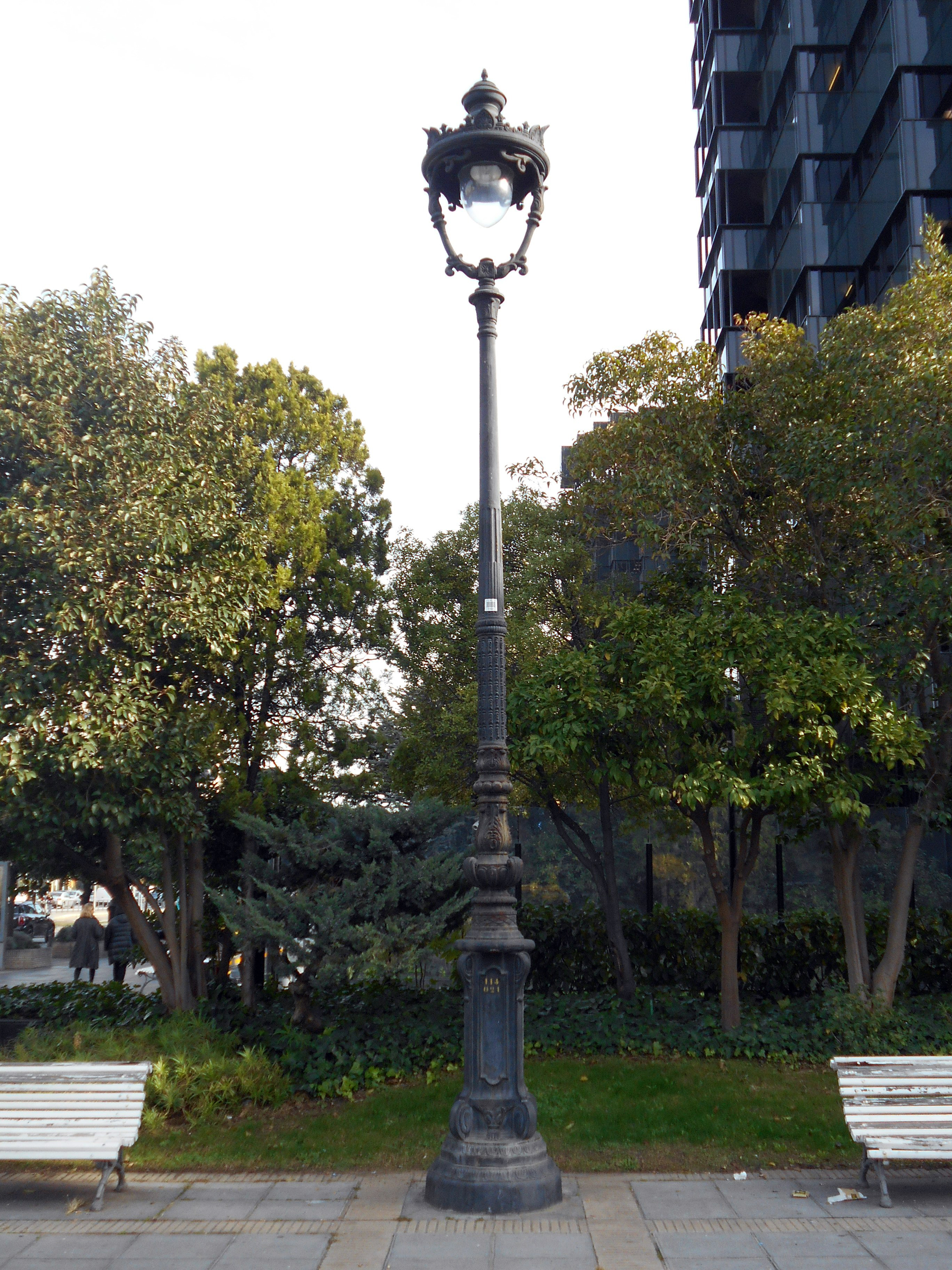
Lira type street light, Avinguda Diagonal.

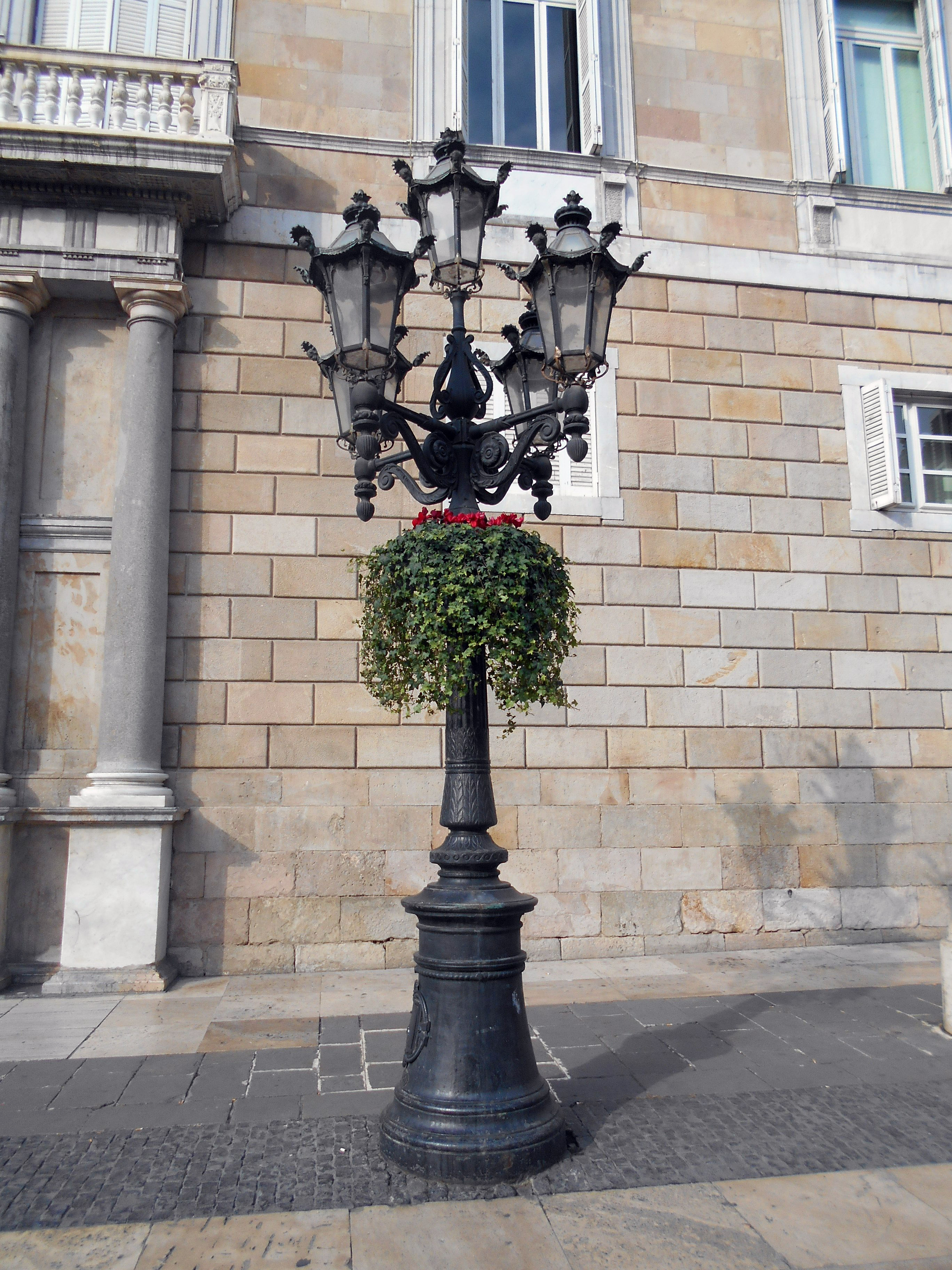
Candelabra in the Plaça Sant Jaume.

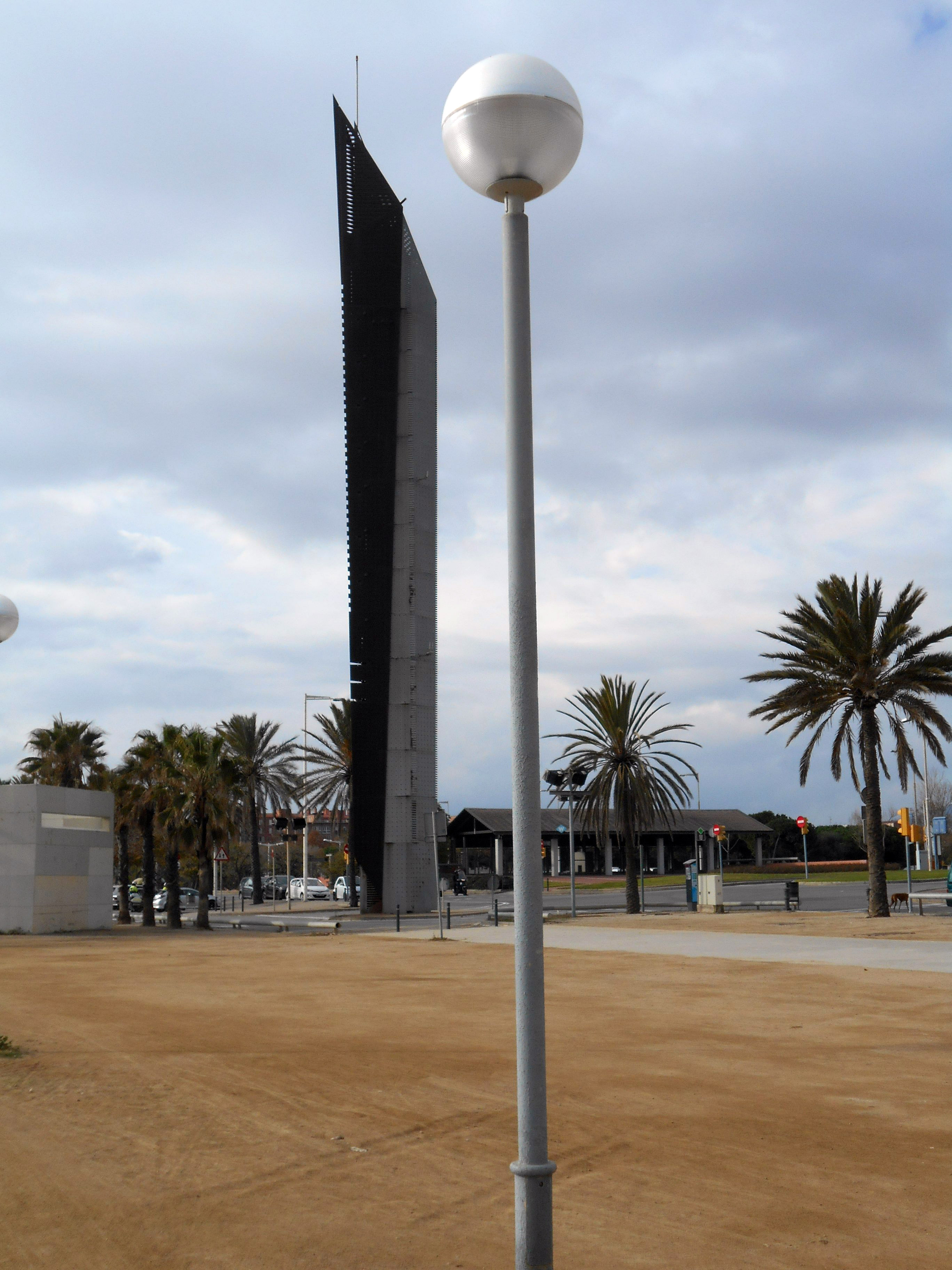
Nikolson column, Bogatell beach.

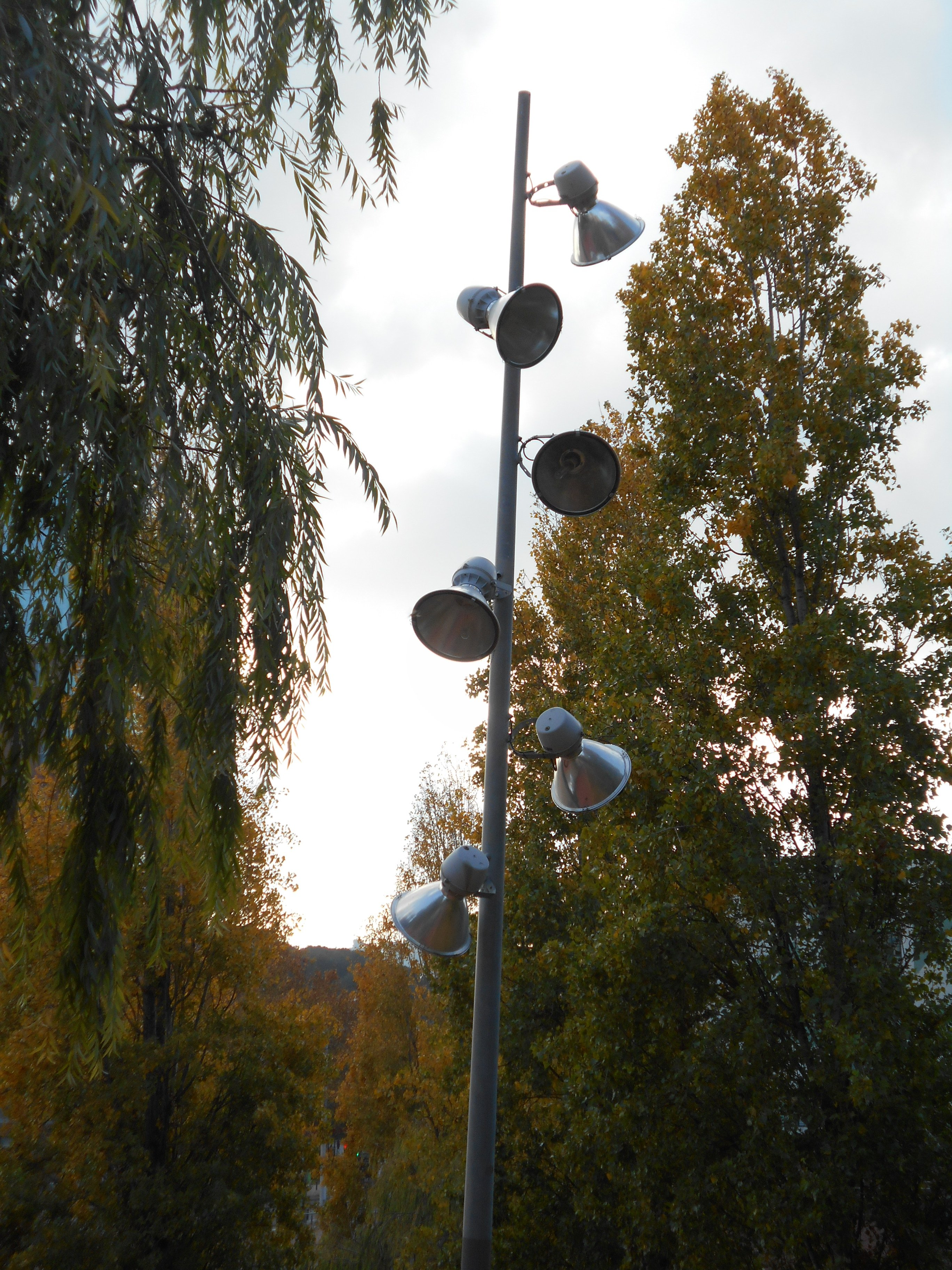
Kanya model column, Nou Barris Central Park.

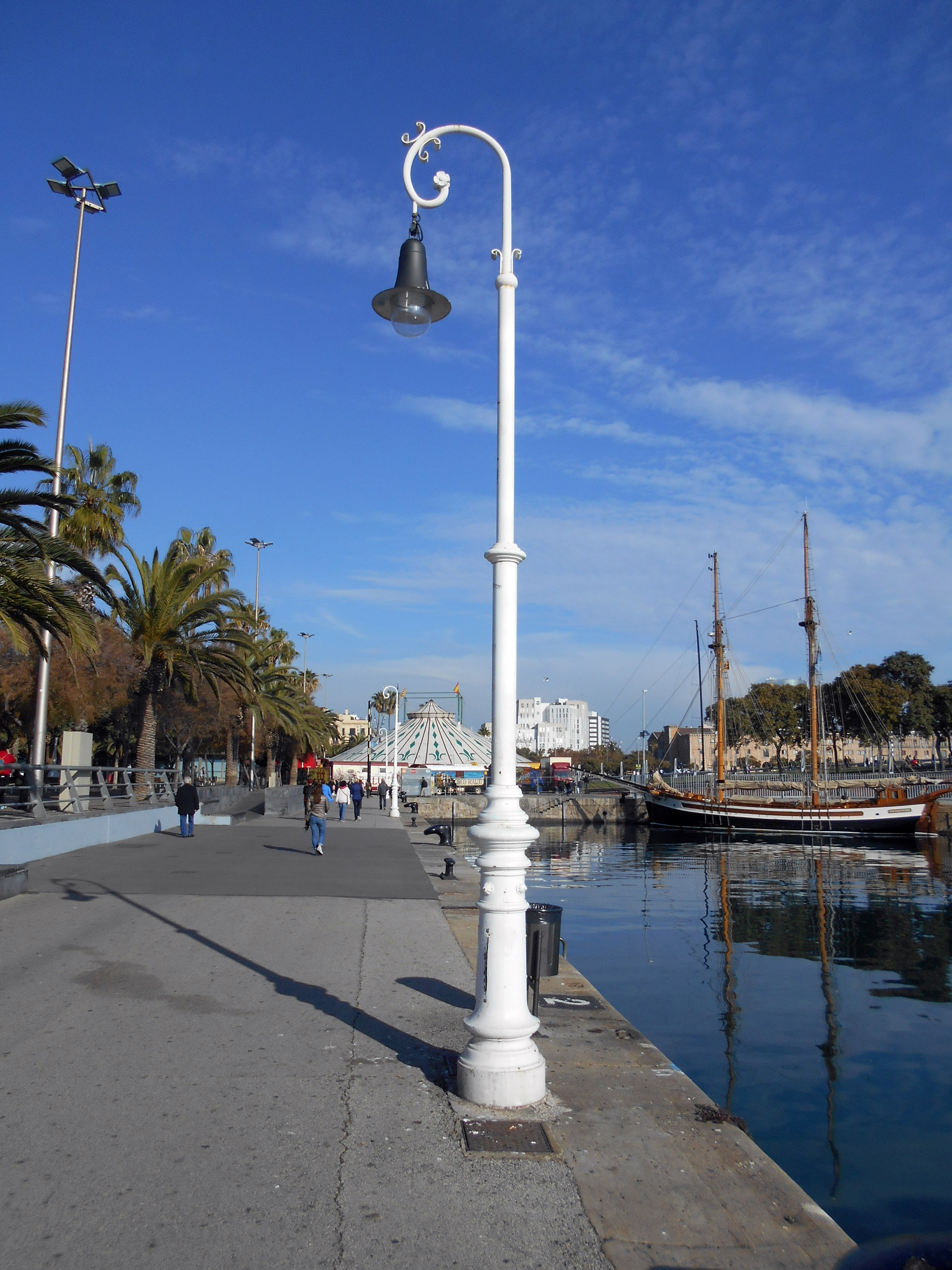
Classic staff, Bosch i Alsina pier.

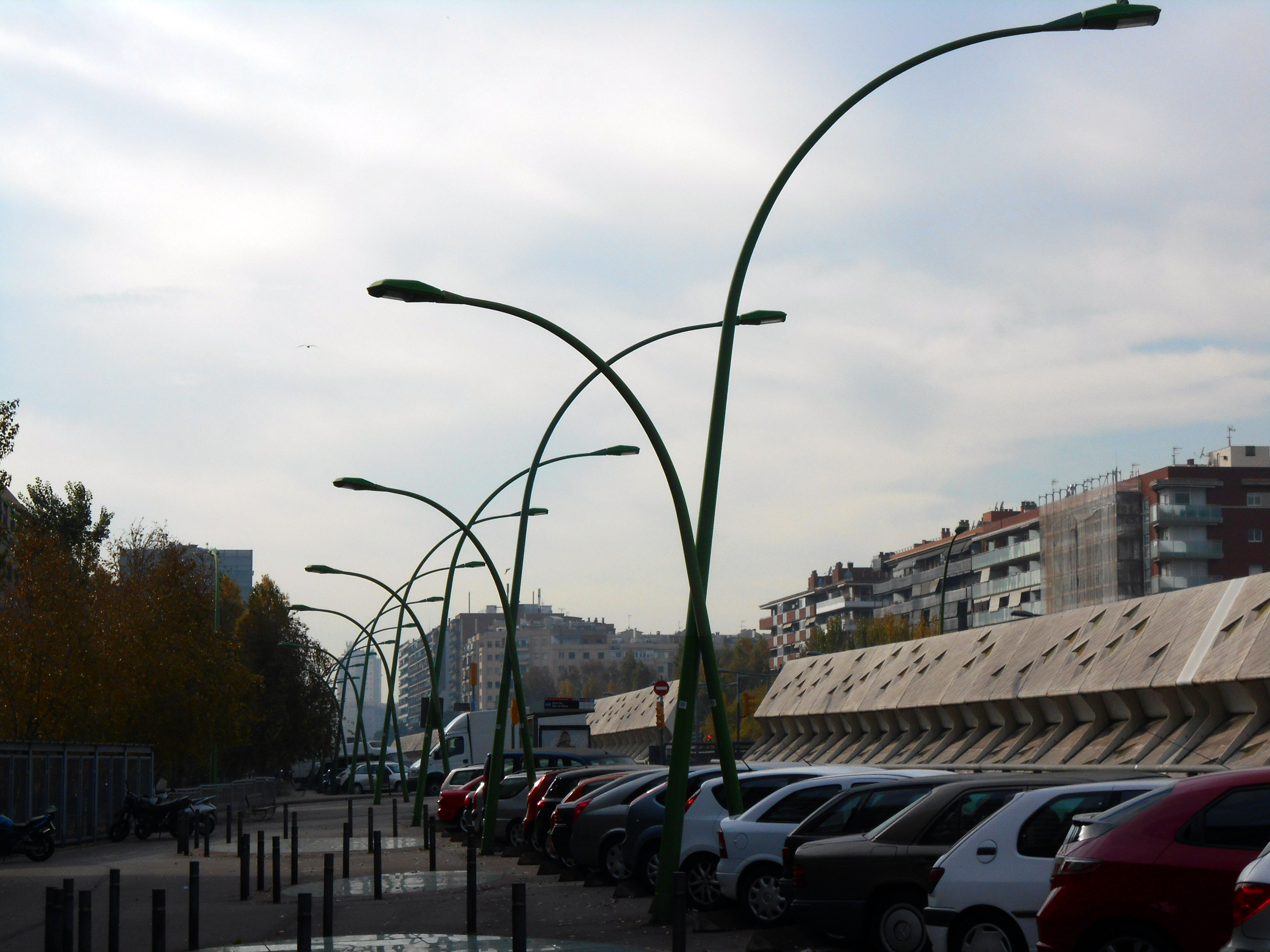
Modern staff, Gran Via de les Corts Catalanes.

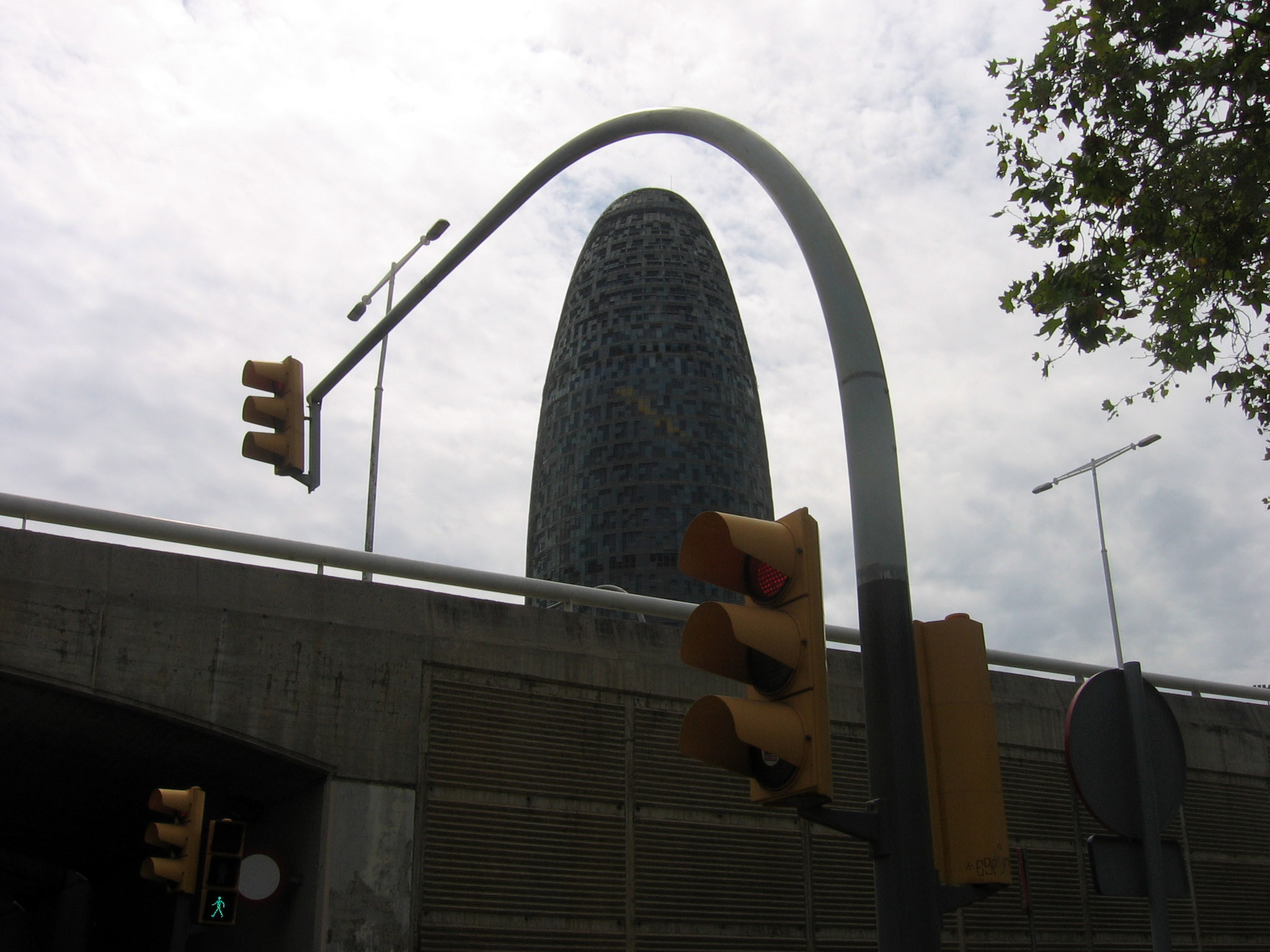
Traffic light, Plaça de les Glòries Catalanes.

Urban furniture:

- Benches: these are used for seating and include benches, stools (benches without backs), armchairs, chairs (armchairs without backs), stools and loungers. They can be made of stone, wood, iron or concrete, with models such as Romantic, Neo-Romantic, Neobarcino, Mediterraneo, Catalano, Montseny, Levit, U, Cadira Nigra, Boston, Sumo, Nu, Marina, Diputació, Koro, G, Alpino, Socrates, Hebi, Lungomare, Sillarga, Sicurta or Modular.
- Fountains: these are water dispensers, generally made of cast iron, with models such as Barcelona, Canaletes, Capilla, Urbana, Badalona, Georgina, Atlántida, Villa Olímpica, Sarastro, Lama, Caudal and Egea.
- Waste container: a container for waste; the most common are the Barcelona (circular and semicircular), Prima Linea, Paperegena and Bina models.
- Flower boxes: these are containers for plants; the most common are the Plaza, Barcina, Tram, Urbana, Lineal, Marisha, Morella, Icaria, Vida, Nomo and Test models.
- Recreational areas: these may include children's playgrounds, sports facilities (soccer, basketball, volleyball, fitness equipment), picnic areas, ping-pong tables, petanque and skateboarding courts.
- Areas for dogs (pipicán).
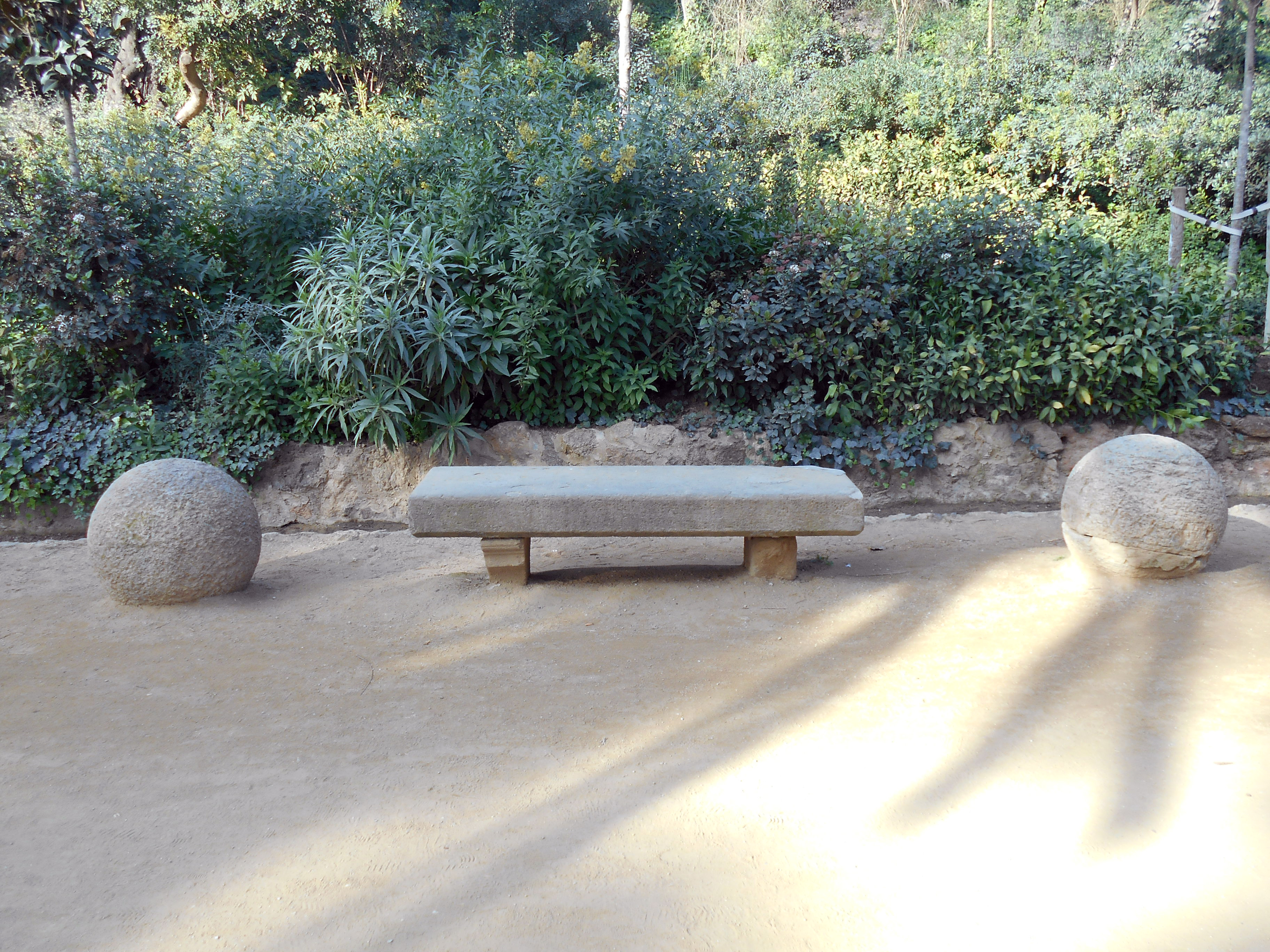
Park Güell bench.

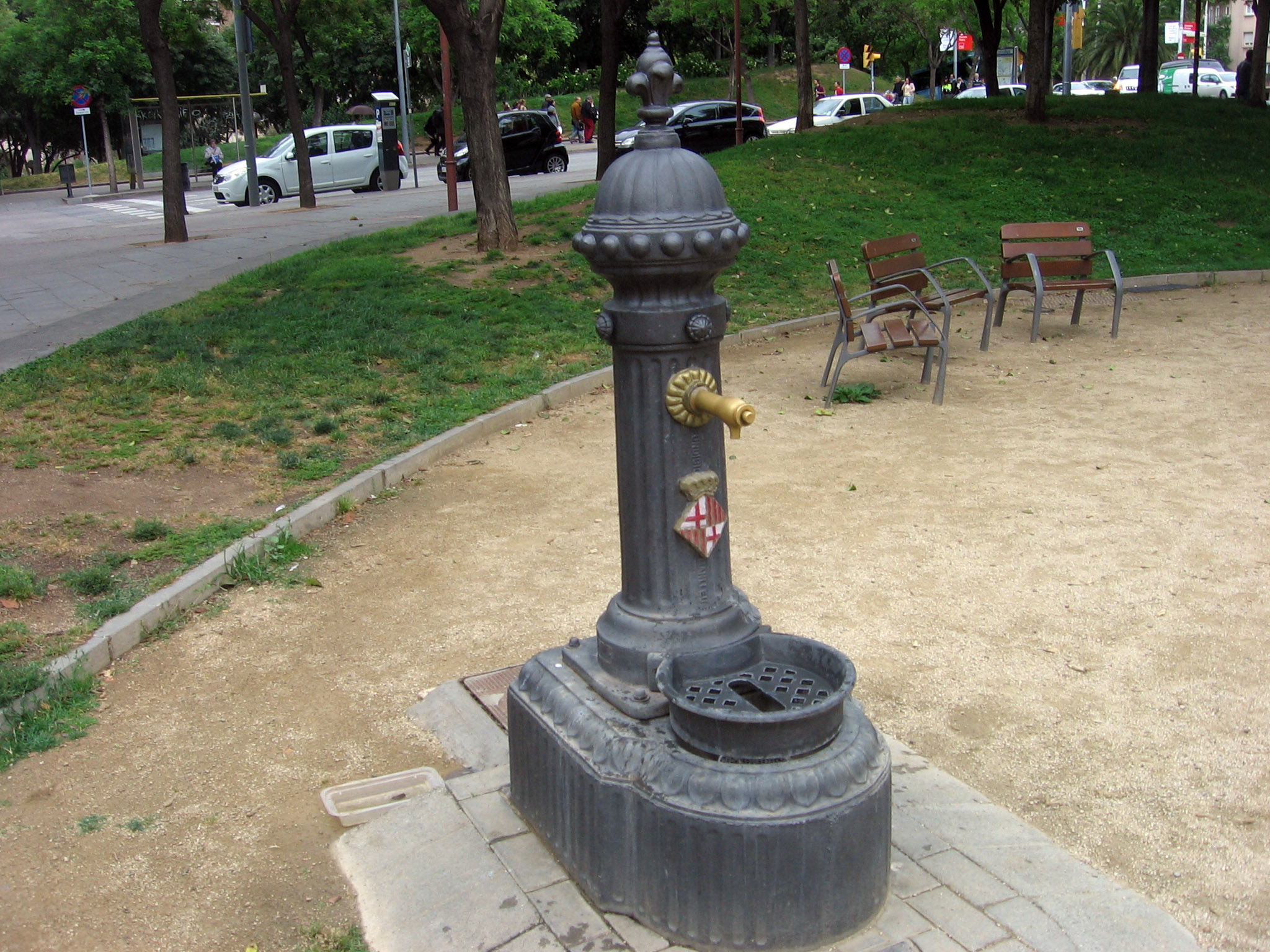
Barcelona model fountain, Pablo Neruda square.

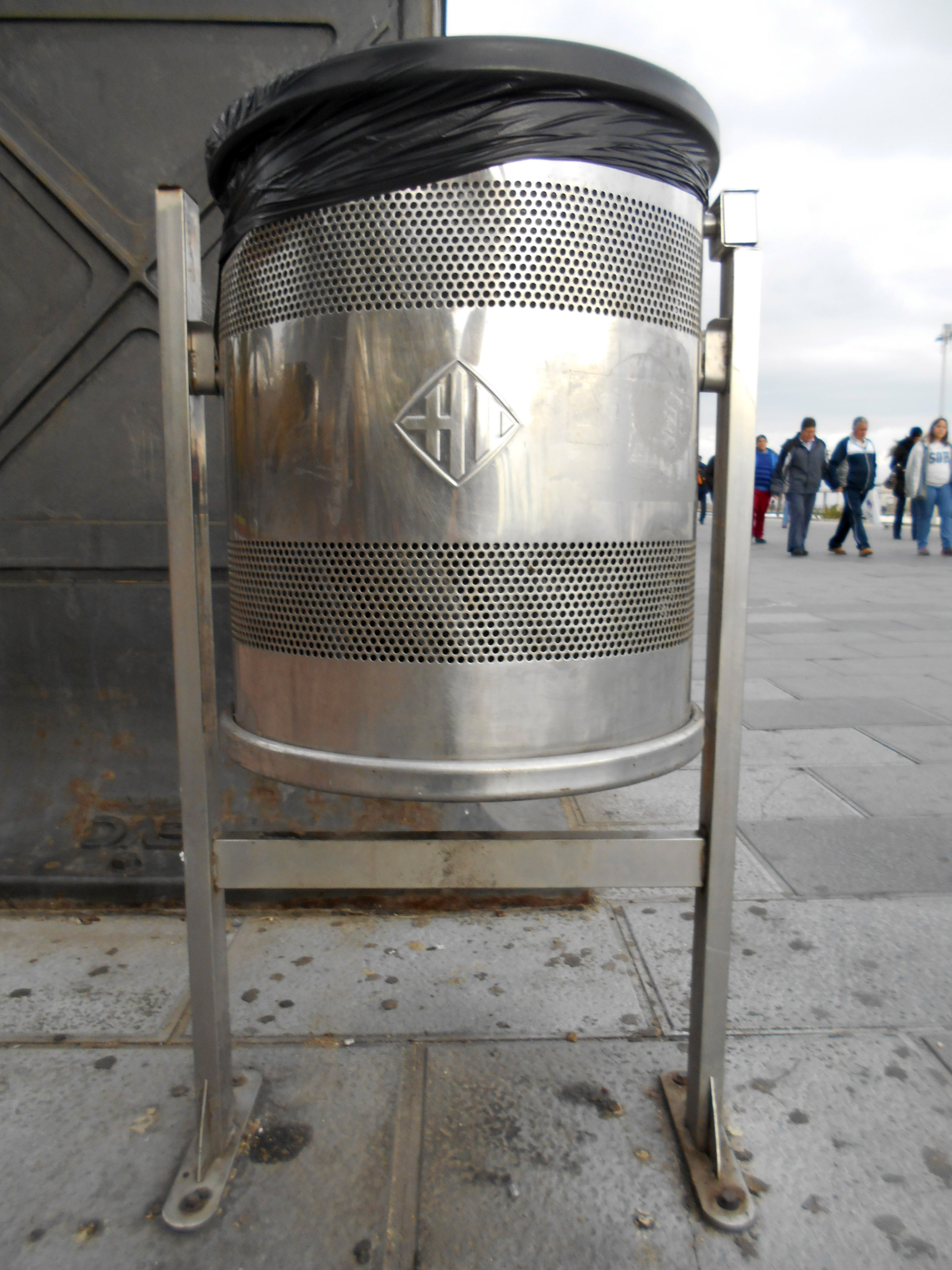
Garbage can.

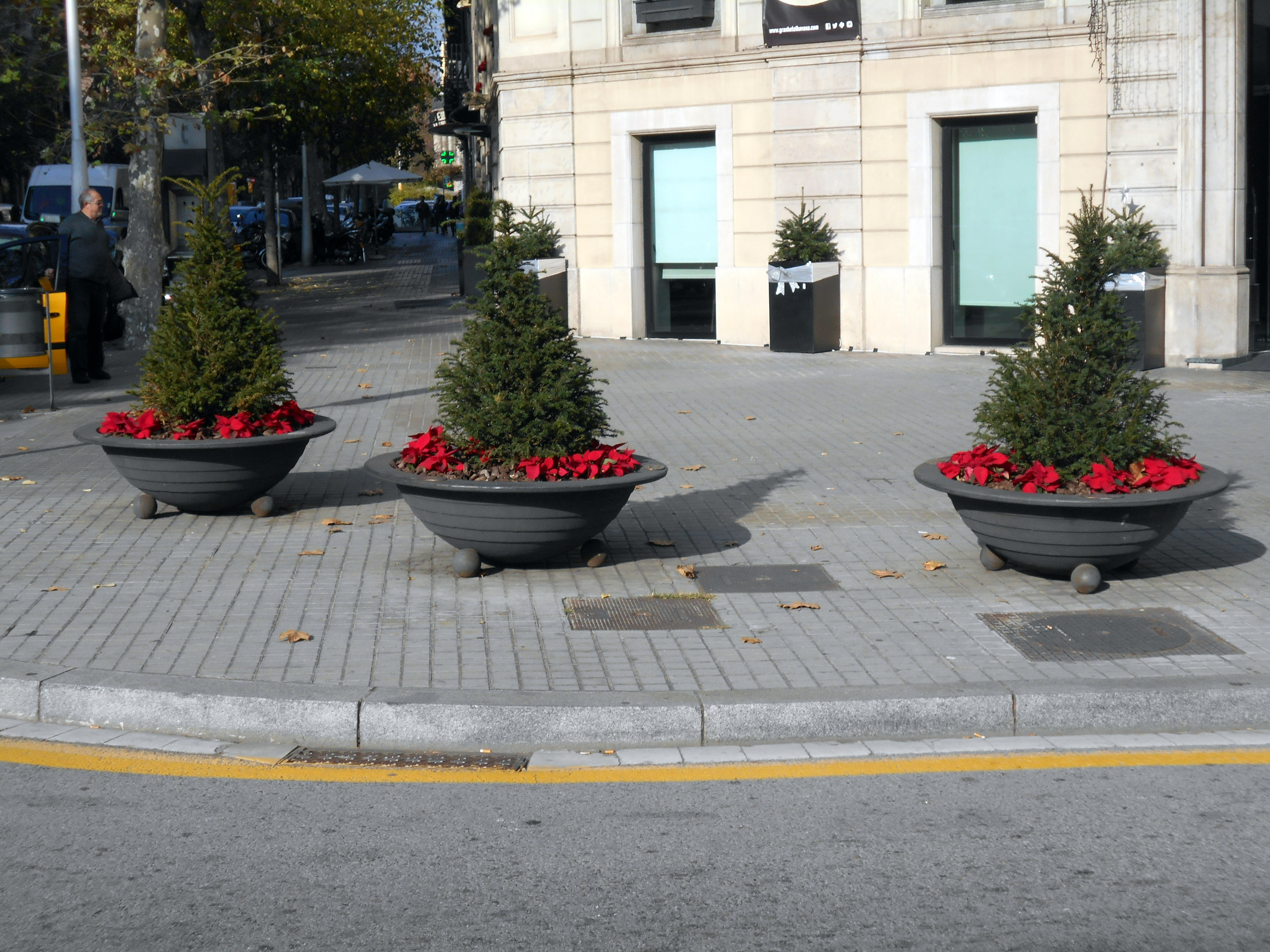
Flower boxes.

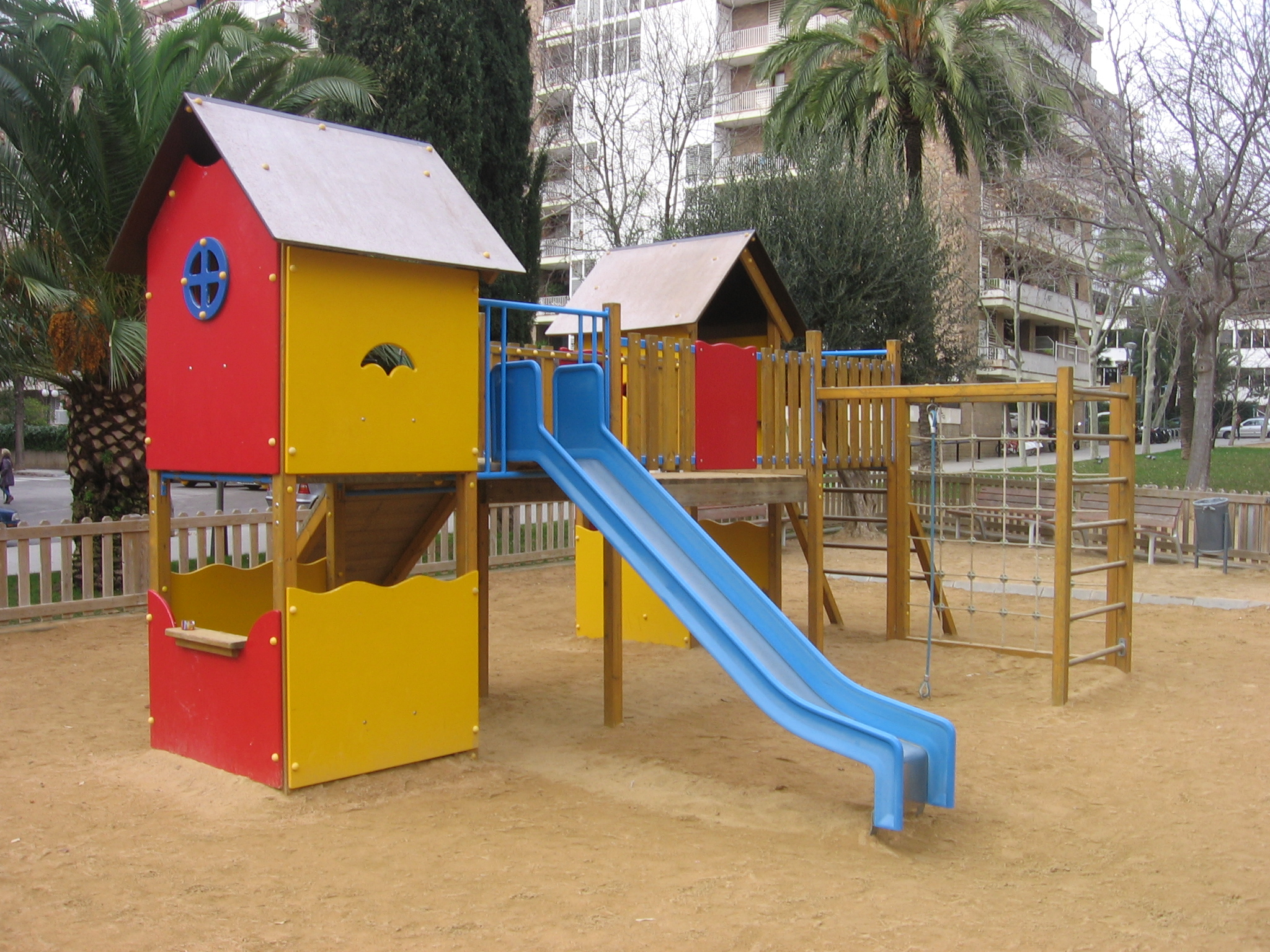
Children's play area.

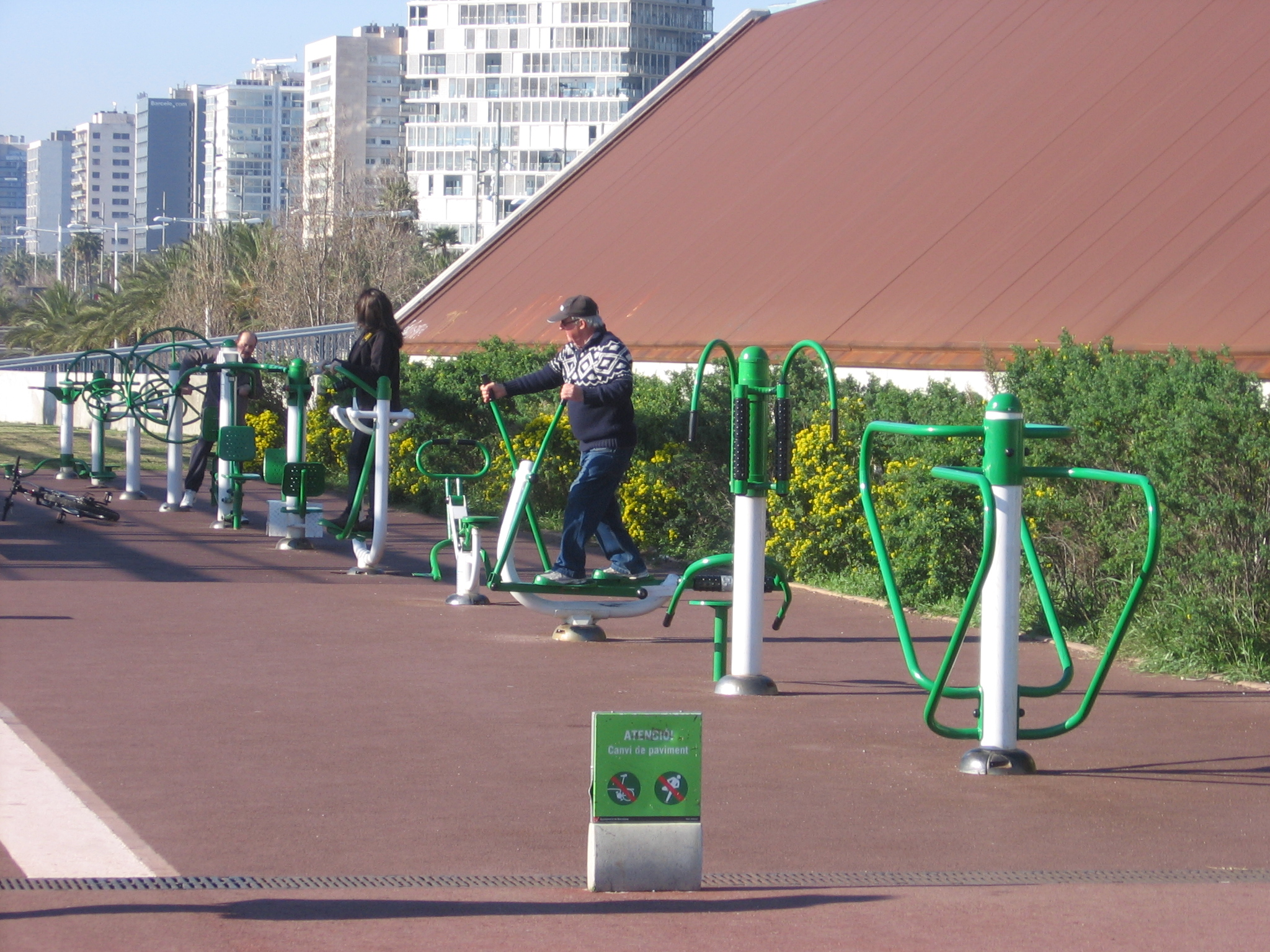
Gym equipment, Camp de la Bota park.

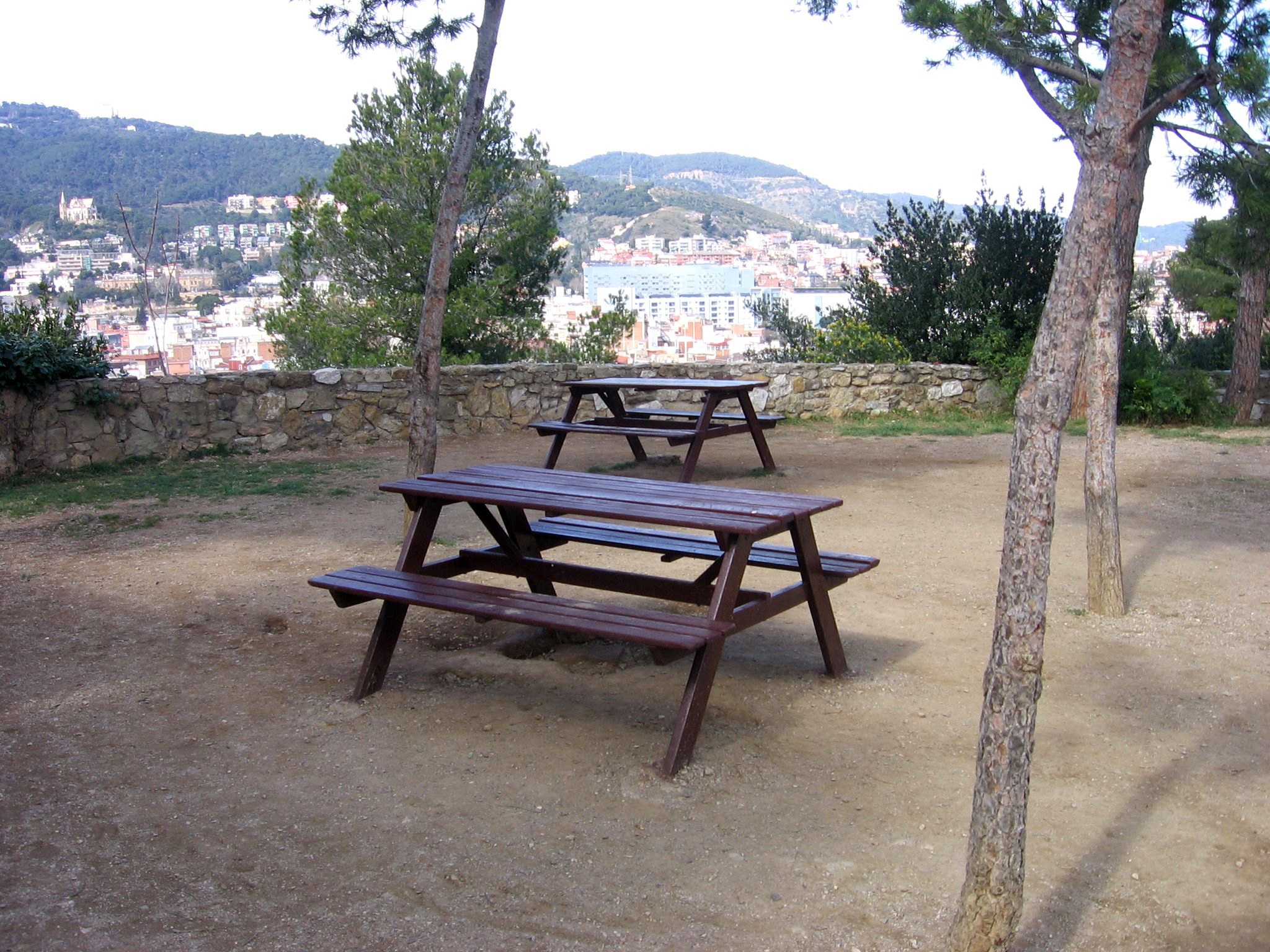
Picnic area, Putxet park.

Public service elements:

- Bus stops: these are canopies to protect from inclement weather while waiting for the bus, include service information and advertising; the main models are Pal-li and Foster.
- Bus and subway stop masts.
- Bus platforms: platform extending the sidewalk into the roadway for pedestrian access to the bus, generally made of concrete with an aluminum grating.
- Pedestrian exit platforms for parking lots and subway stations.
- Bicycle parking rack: used for parking bicycles, the most common model is the Bici-N.
- Parking meters: are used to pay for vehicle parking.
- Payphones: are used to make telephone calls for a fee.
- Post boxes: used for depositing mail; some are yellow for normal use, green for exclusive use by letter carriers and red for urgent mail.
- Waste container: used to collect garbage; there are also selective waste collection containers (paper, plastic, glass, batteries, clothes) and pneumatic collection containers. They can be surface waste container (3200 or 1100 liters) or underground.
- Public toilets: there are still some fixed toilets, generally subway, but nowadays most are portable cabins.
- Showers and watchtowers for beaches.
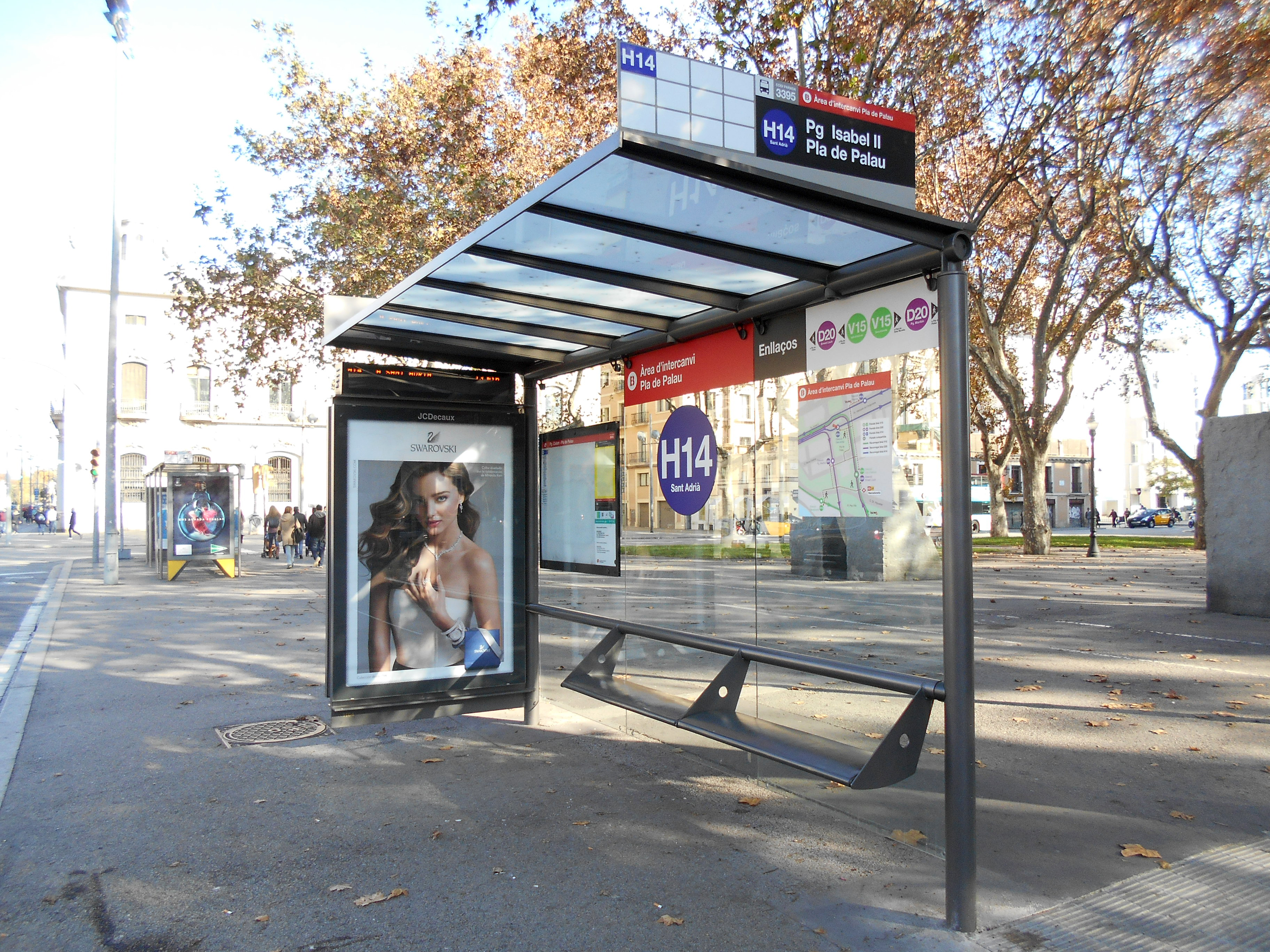
Foster canopy.

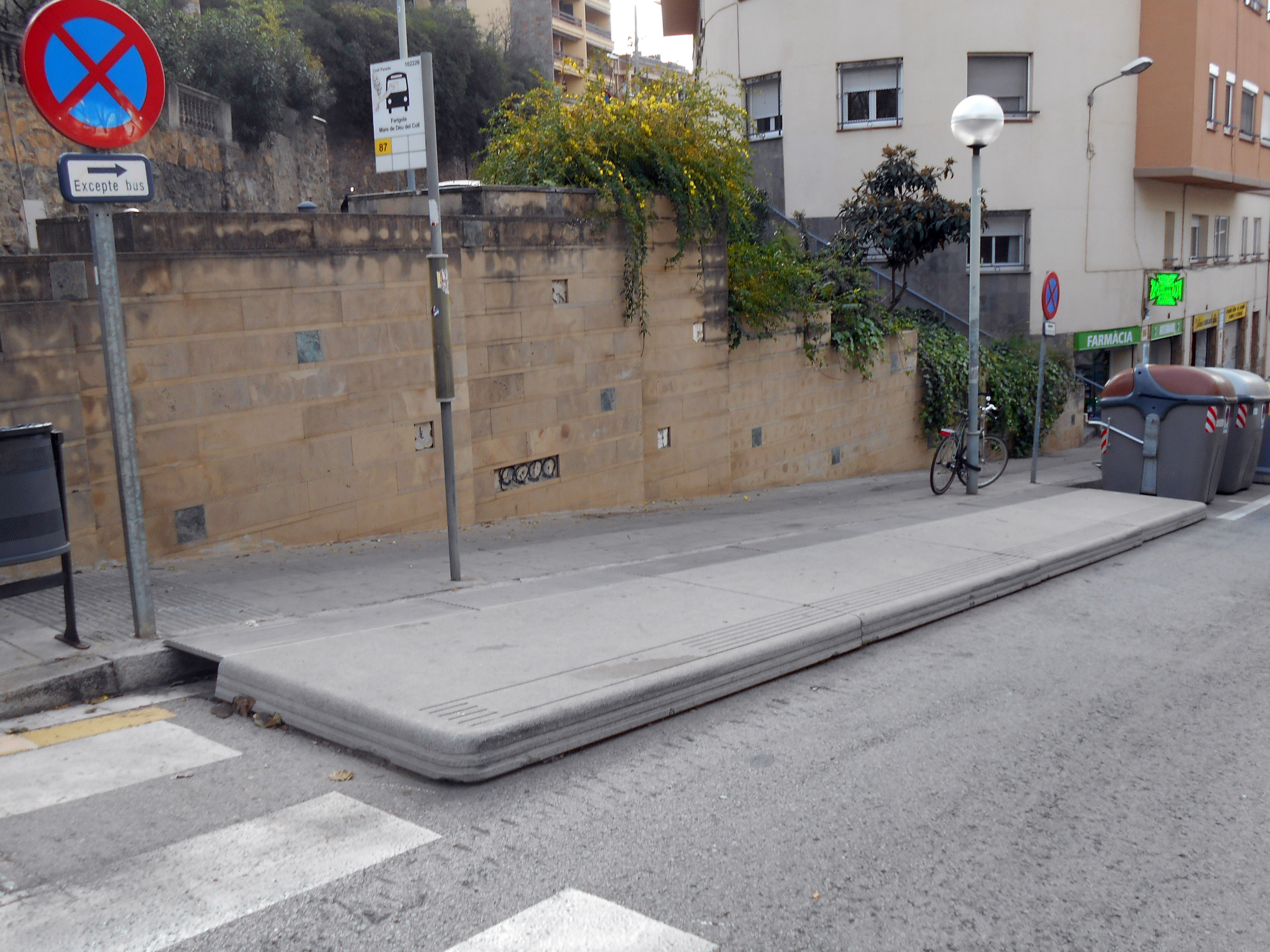
Bus platform.

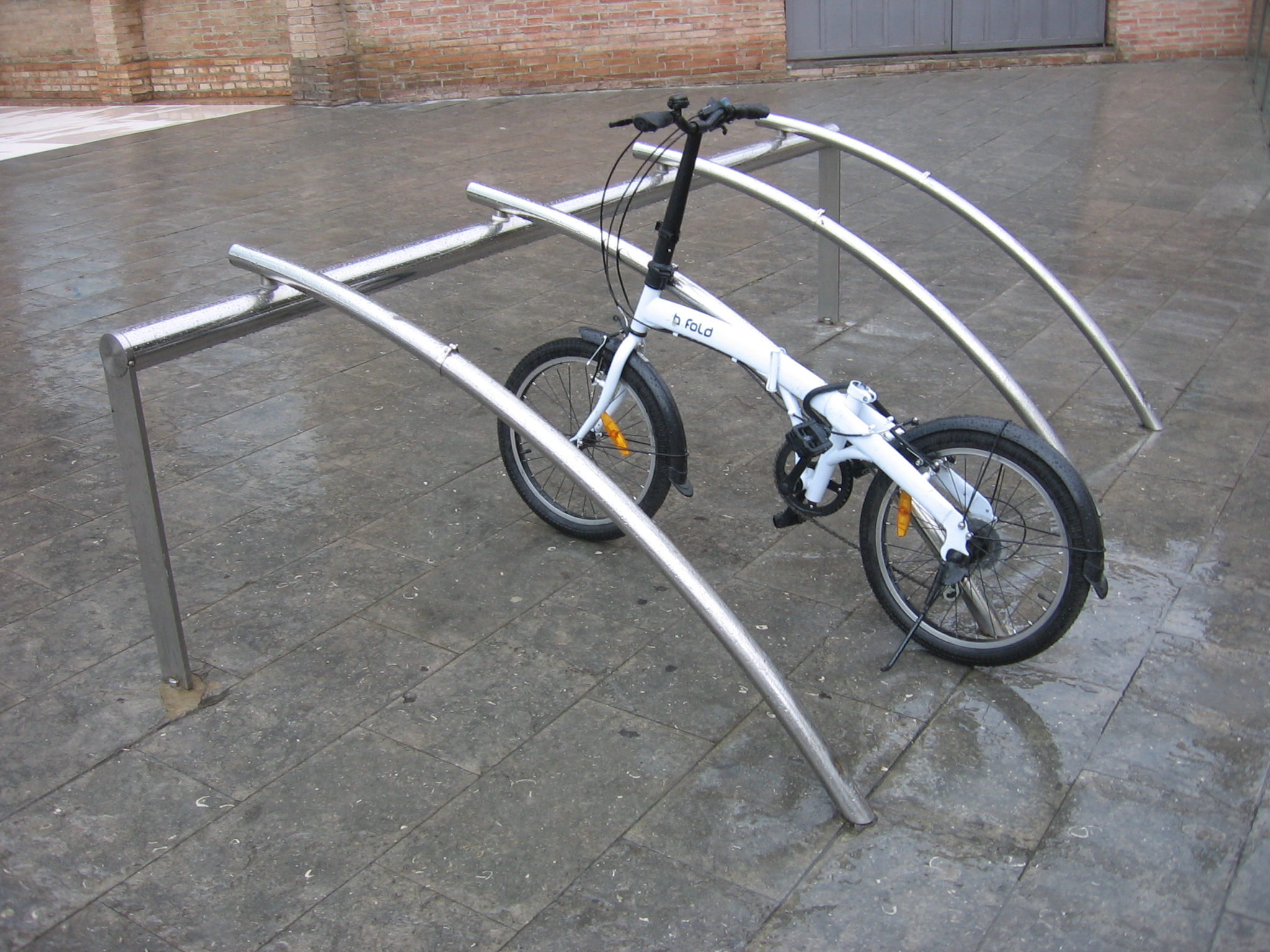
Anchorage for bicycles.

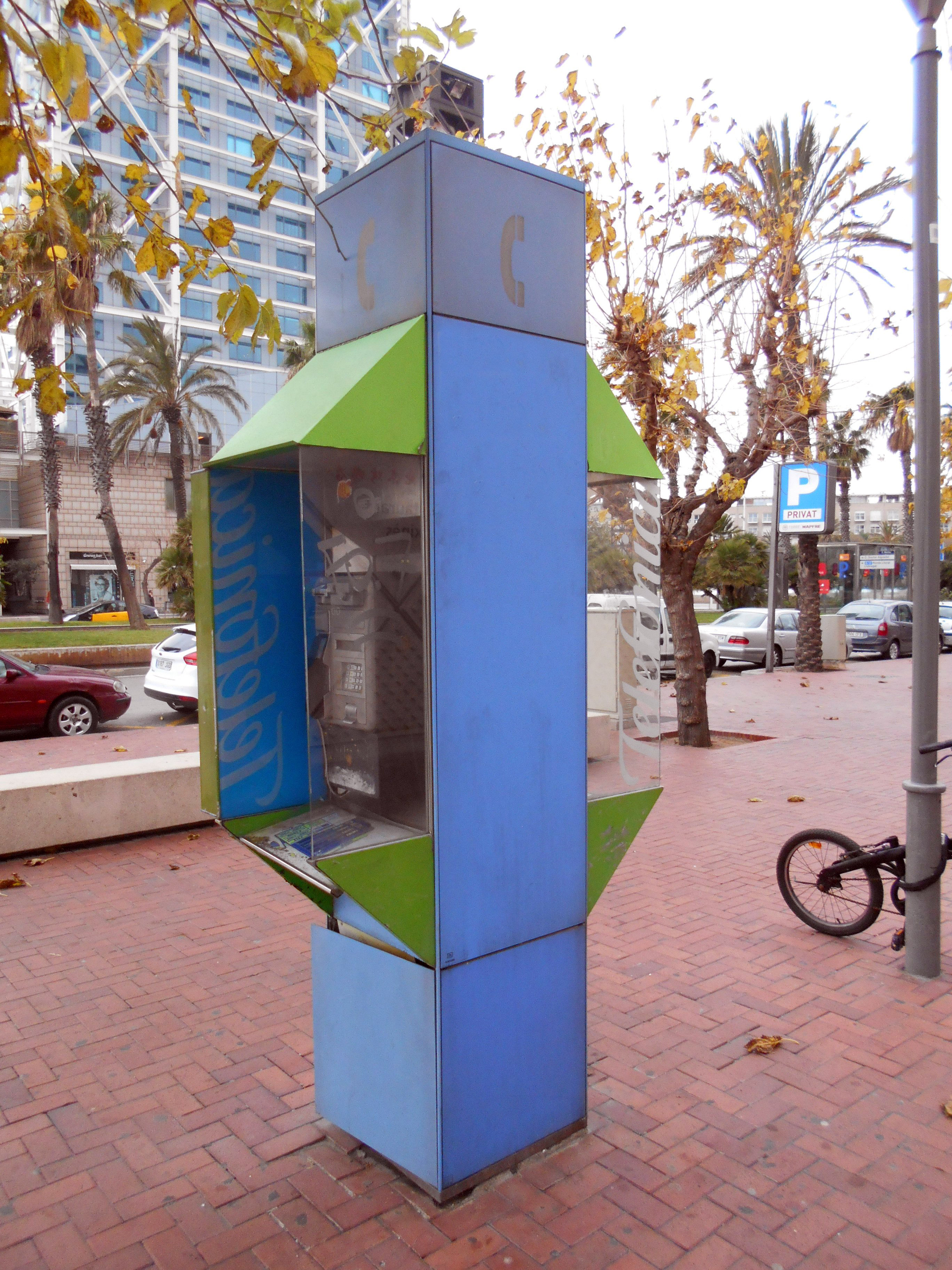
Payphone.

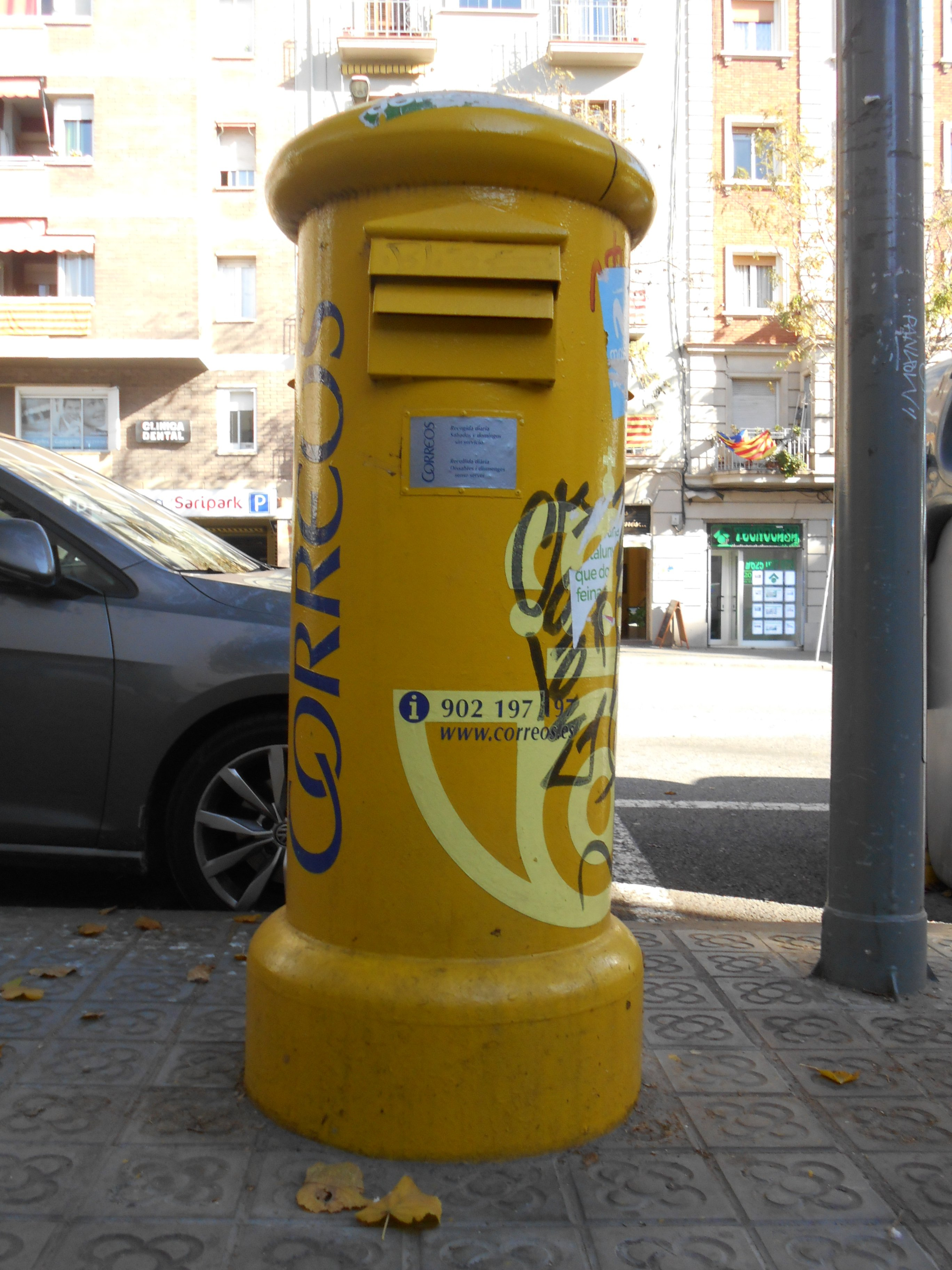
Mailbox.

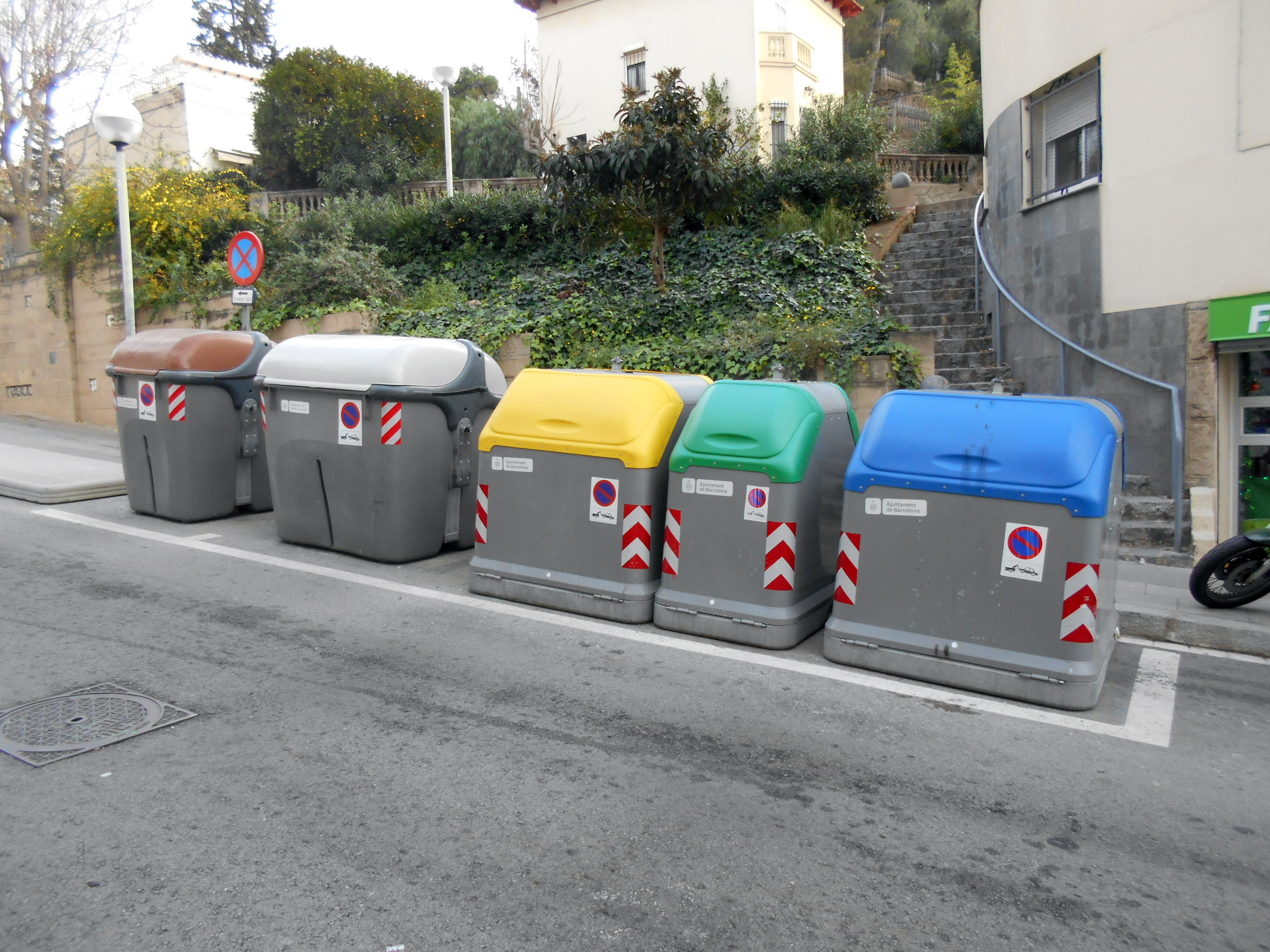
Garbage and selective collection waste container.

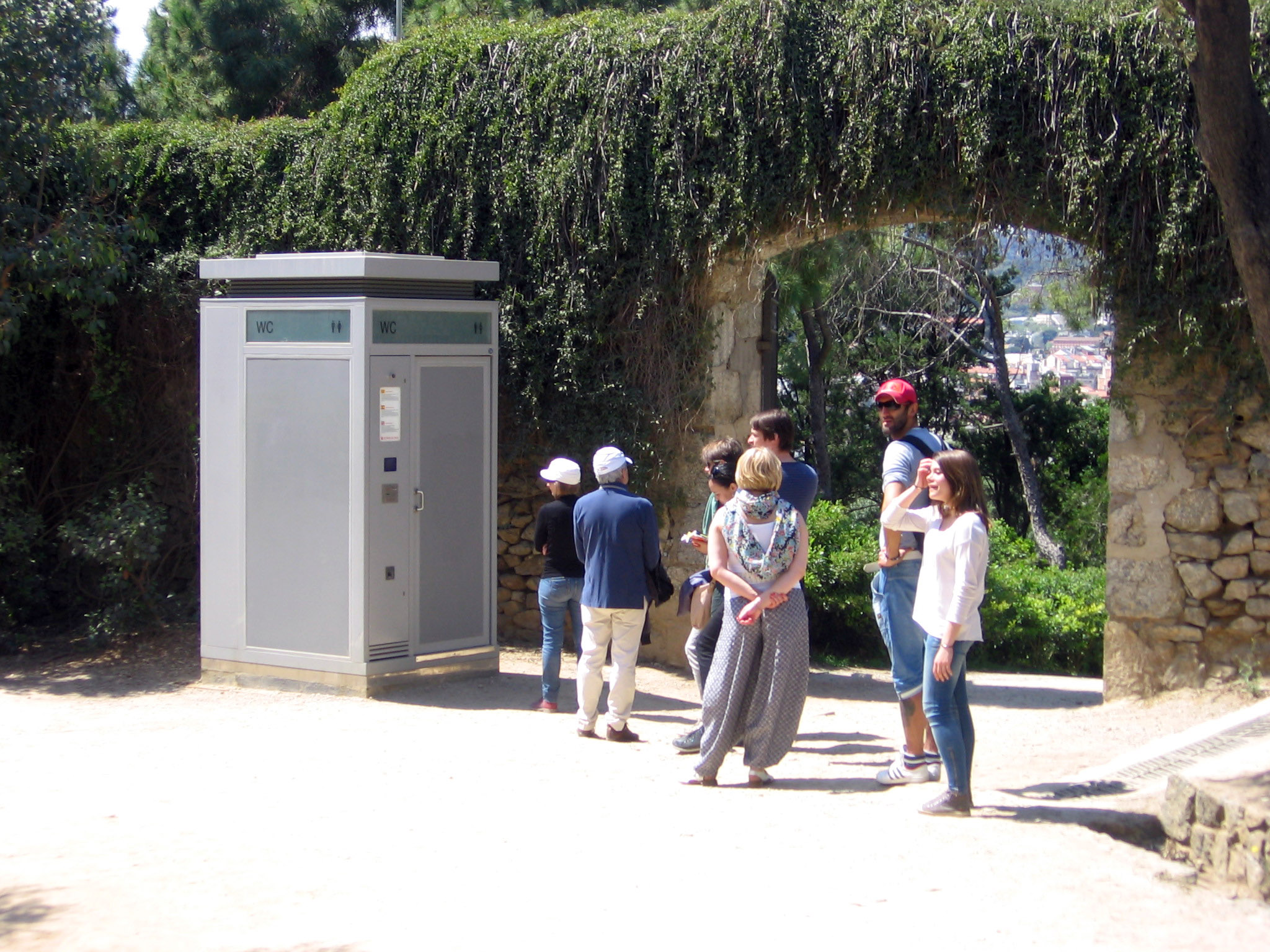
Public toilet, Park Güell.

Information and propaganda elements:

- Banderolas: canvas banners placed on columns or masts, they are generally used to advertise exhibitions or cultural events.
- Advertising columns: used to place advertising, the most commonly used model is Expresión Libre.
- PIM-OPI (Panell d'Informació Municipal-Objecte Publicitari Il·luminat): is a display case with interior lighting for the placement of municipal information or advertising.
- TAM (Municipal Bulletin Board): municipal information display case, generally located in public buildings.

Commercial elements:

- Bar and restaurant terraces: these are an extension to the exterior of the services offered by this type of establishment; they usually include elements such as chairs, tables, umbrellas, flower boxes, ashtrays and heaters.
- Booths: for the sale of products such as newspapers, flowers, lottery or catering; within the latter, products such as drinks, ice cream, chestnuts or sweets.
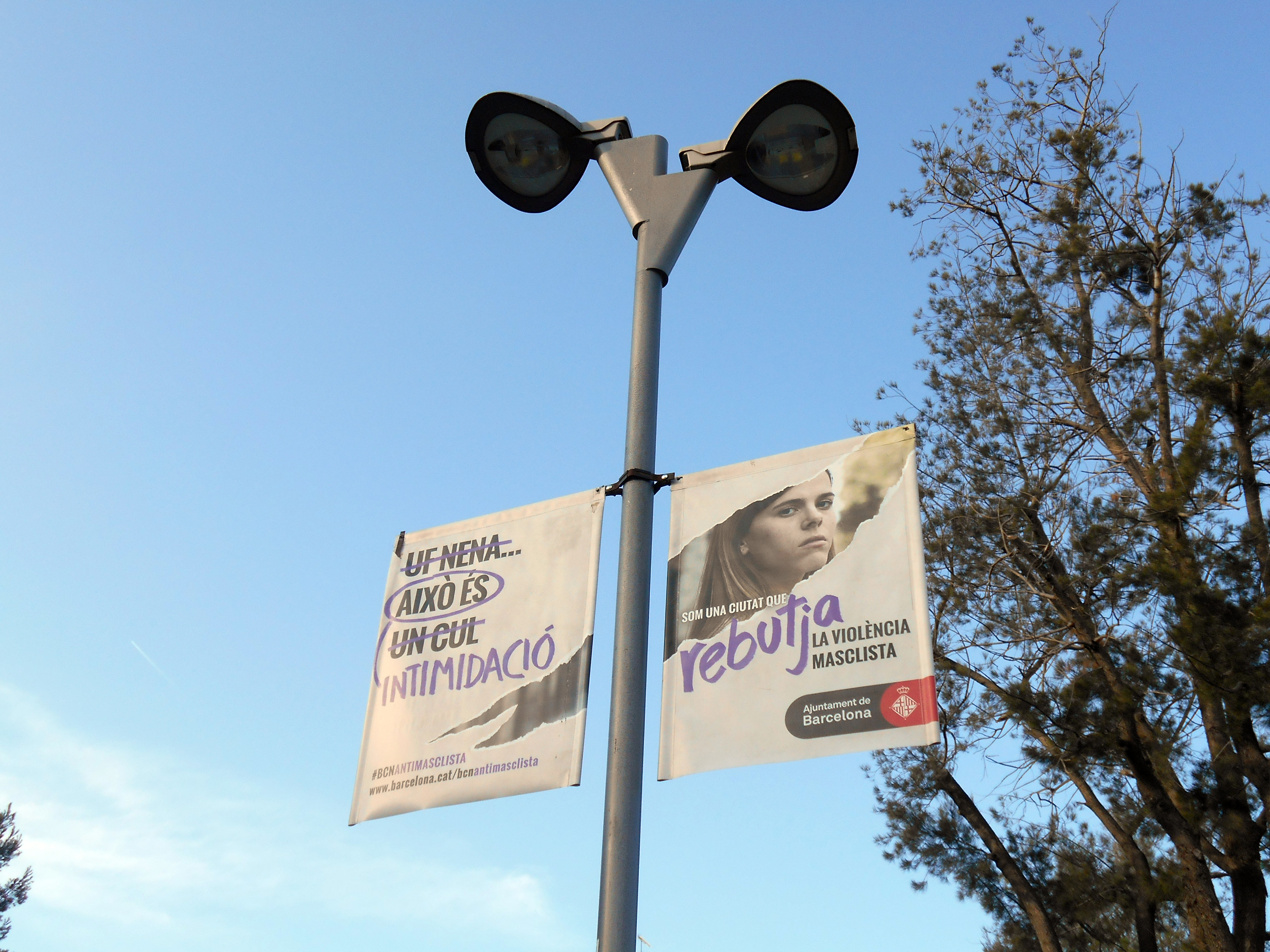
Banner.

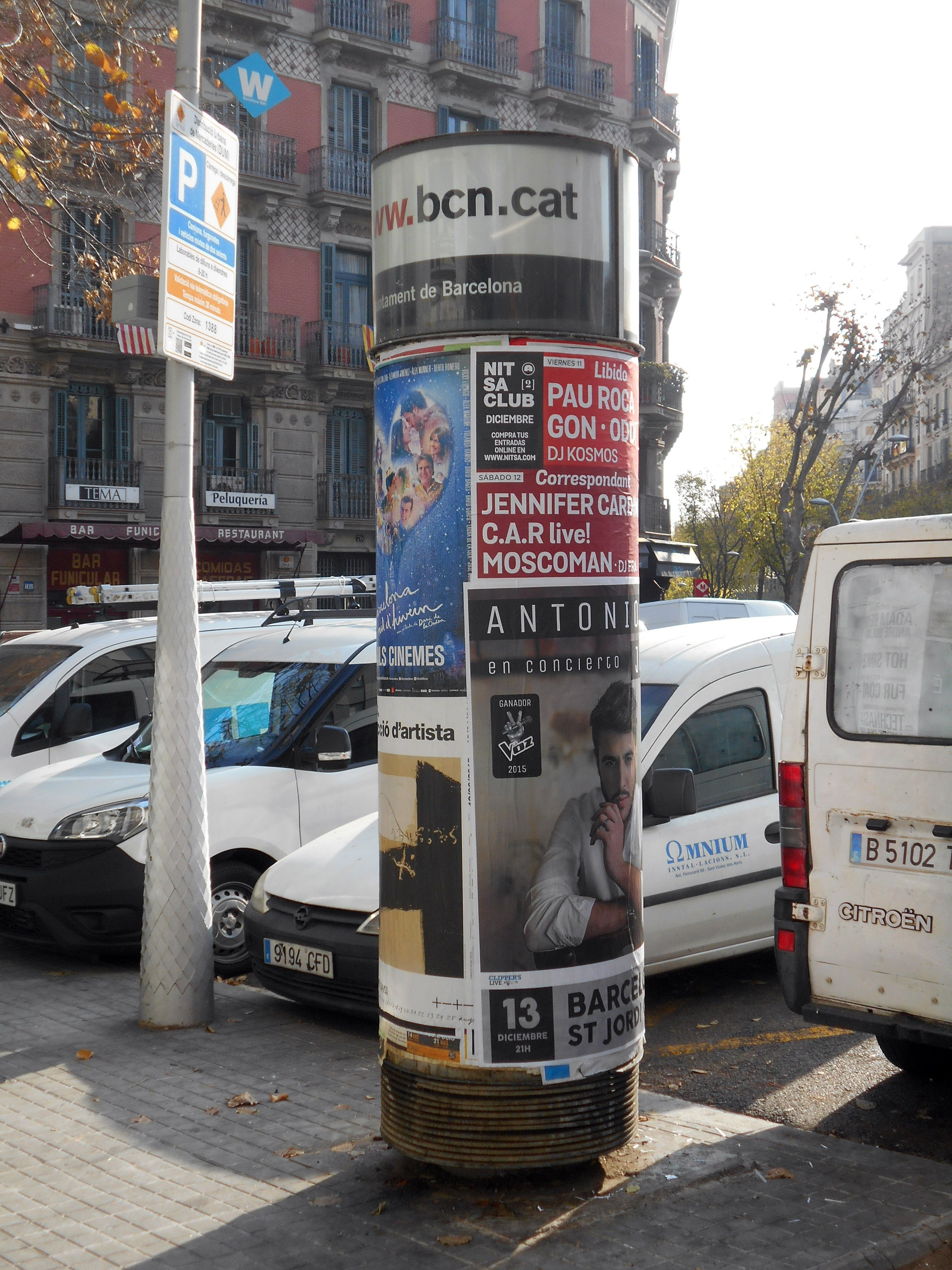
Expresión Libre column.

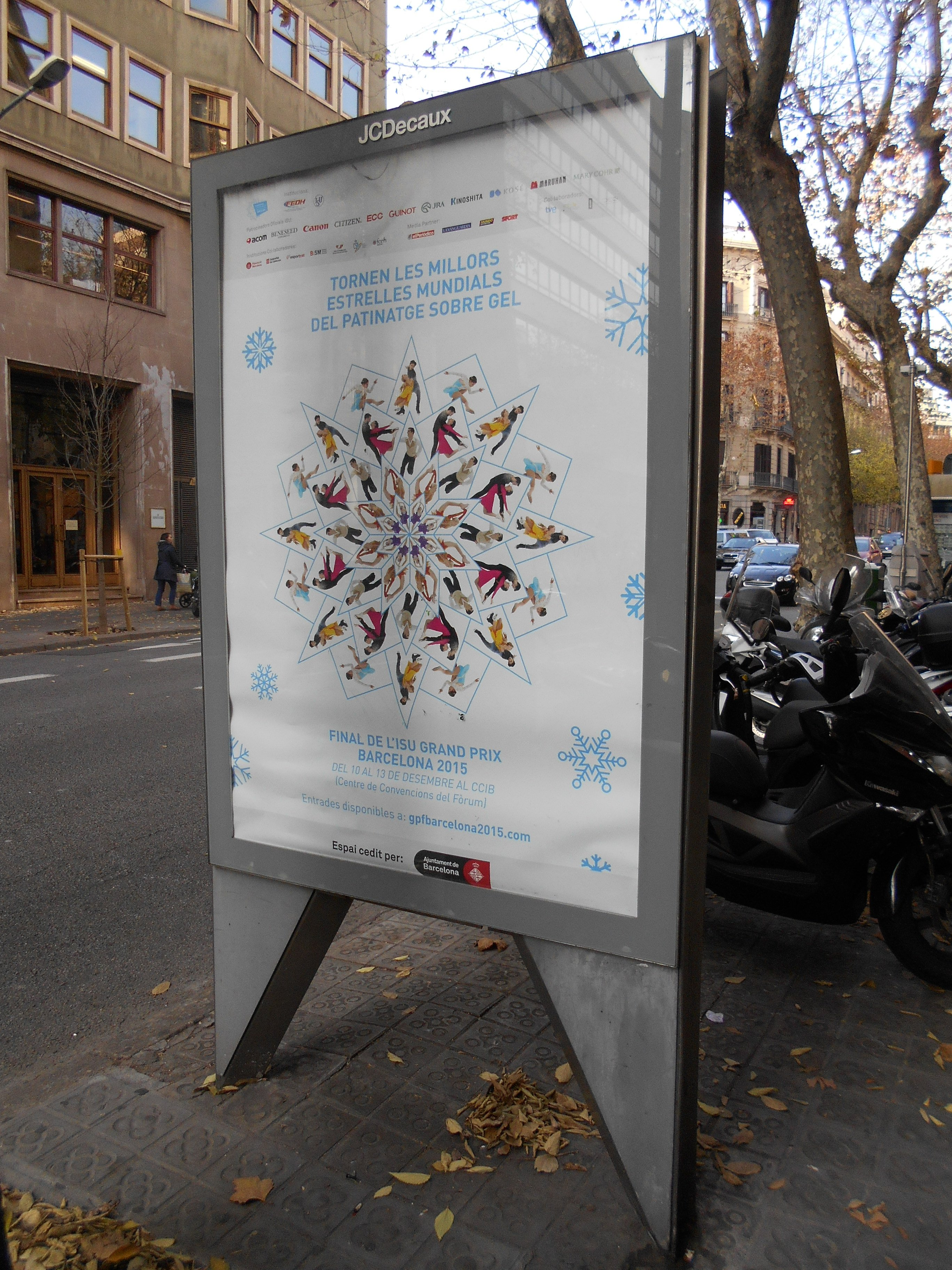
PIM-OPI.

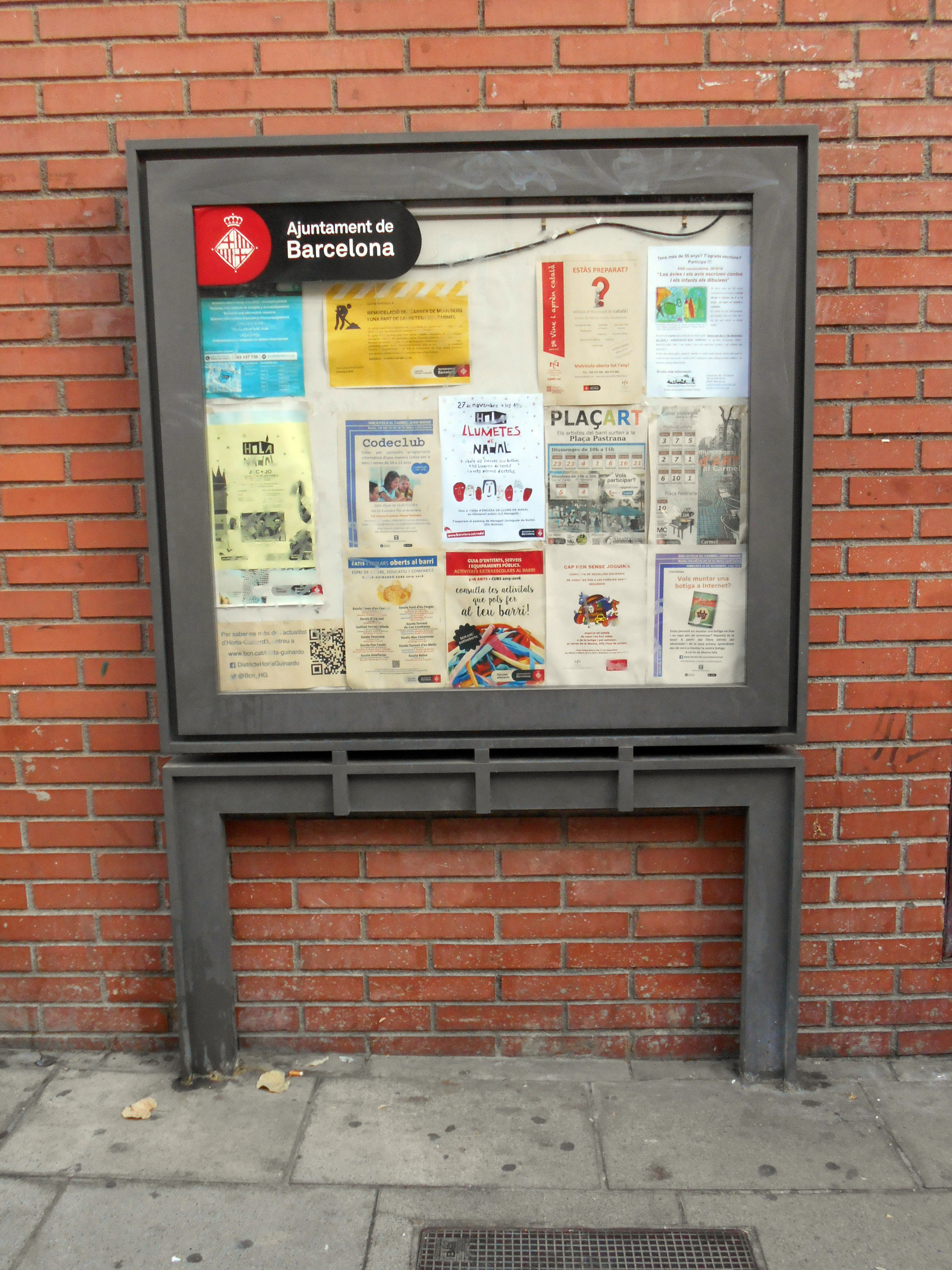
TAM.

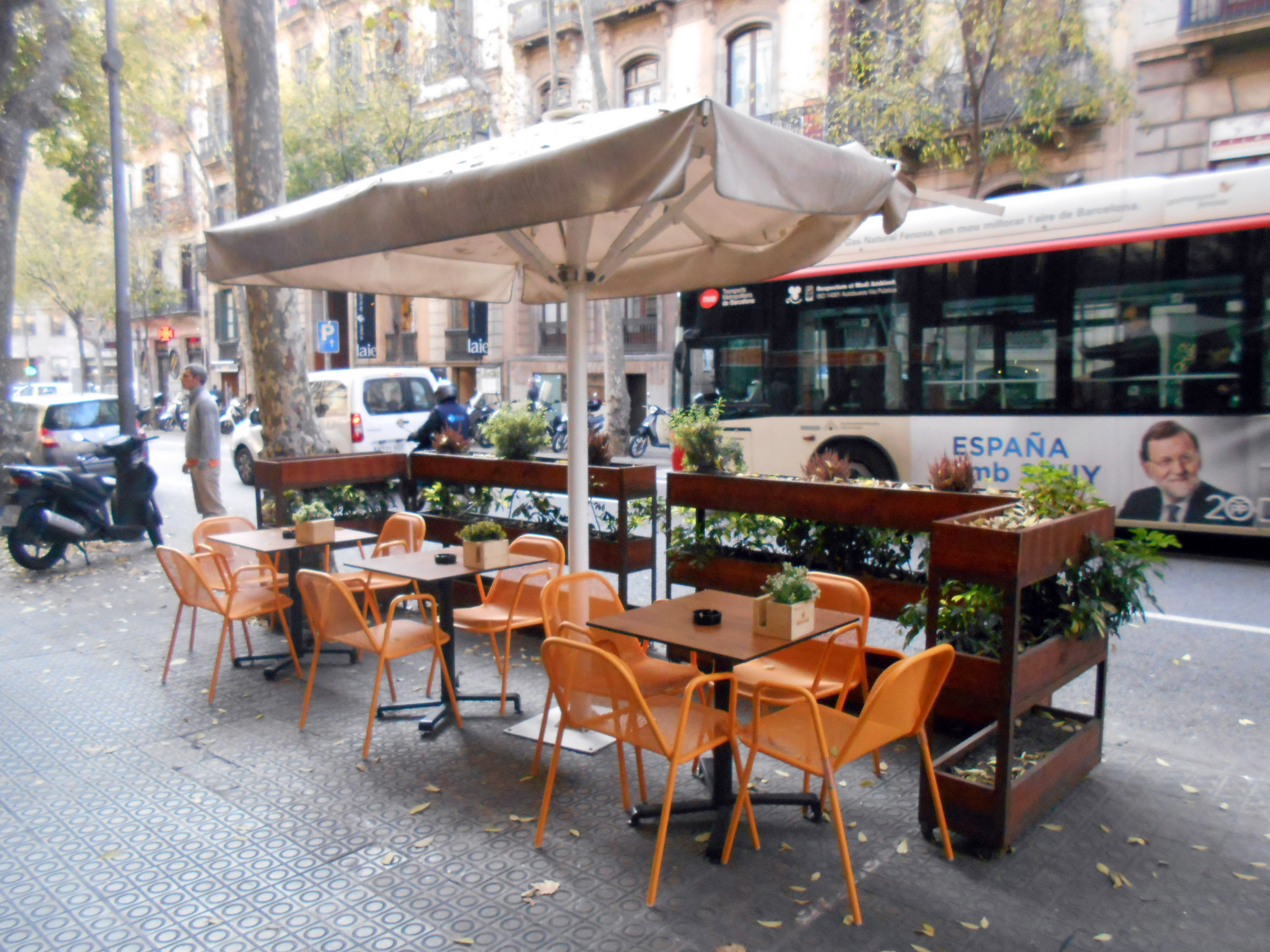
Bar terrace.

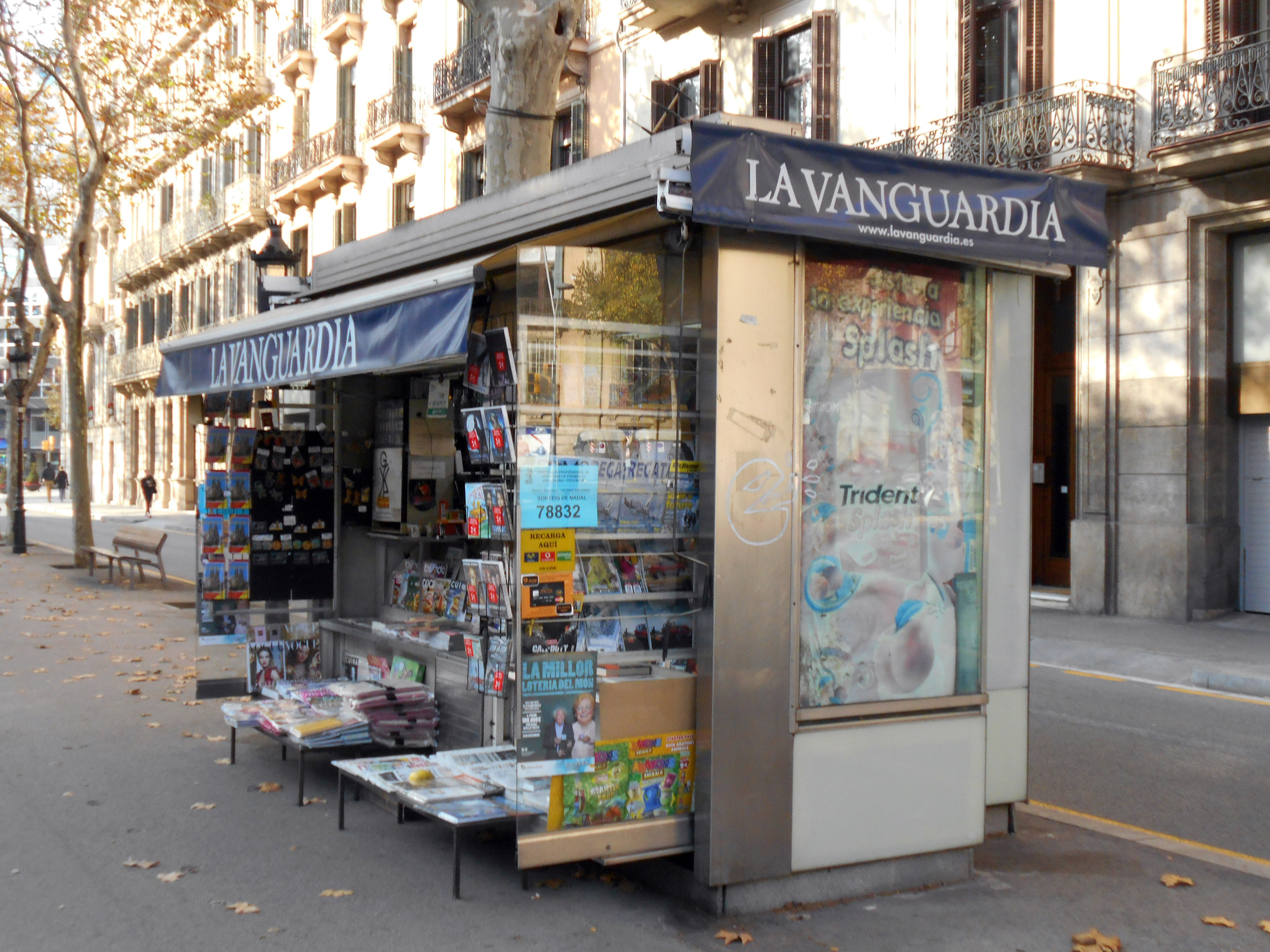
Press booth.

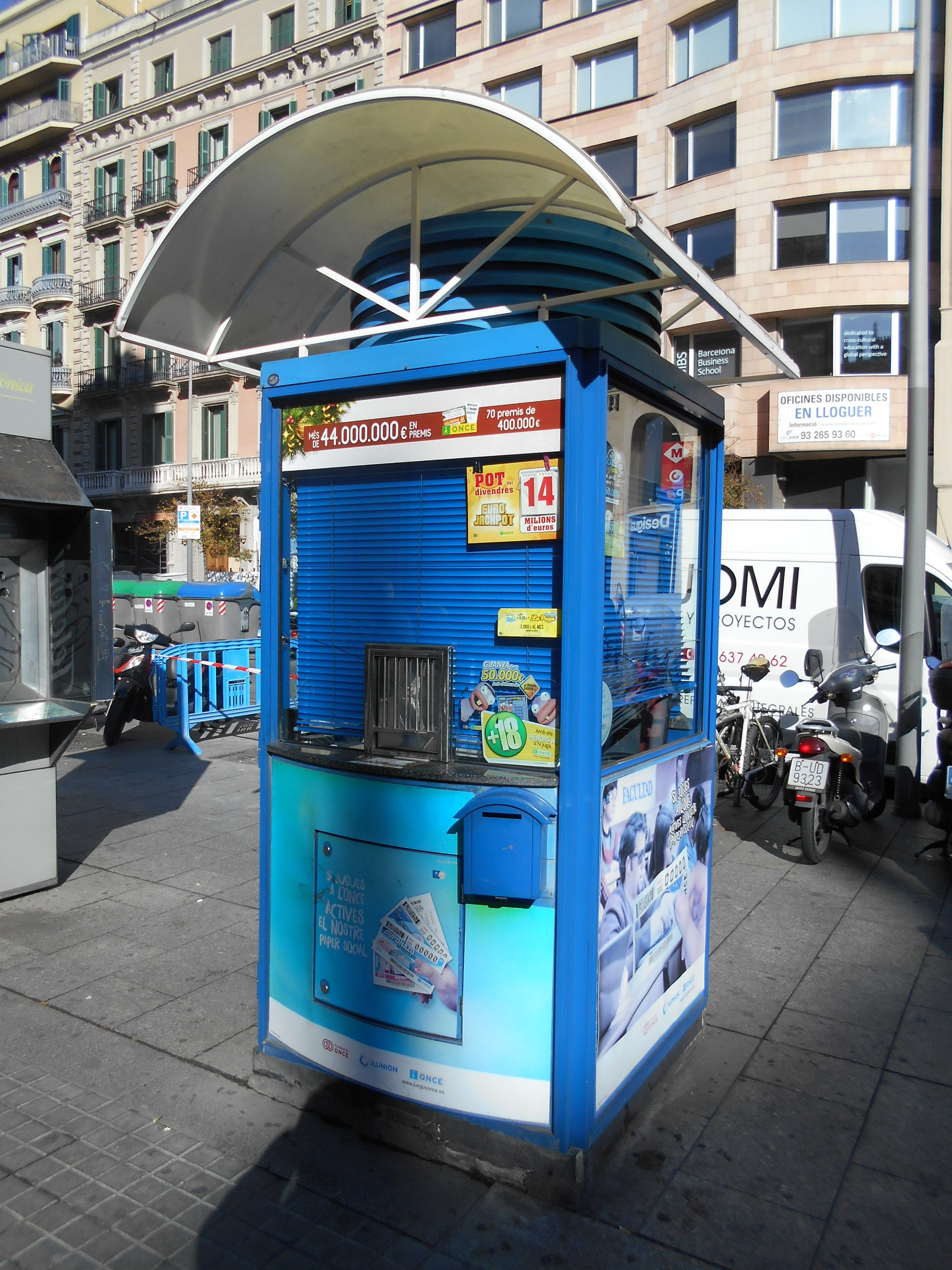
Lottery booth.

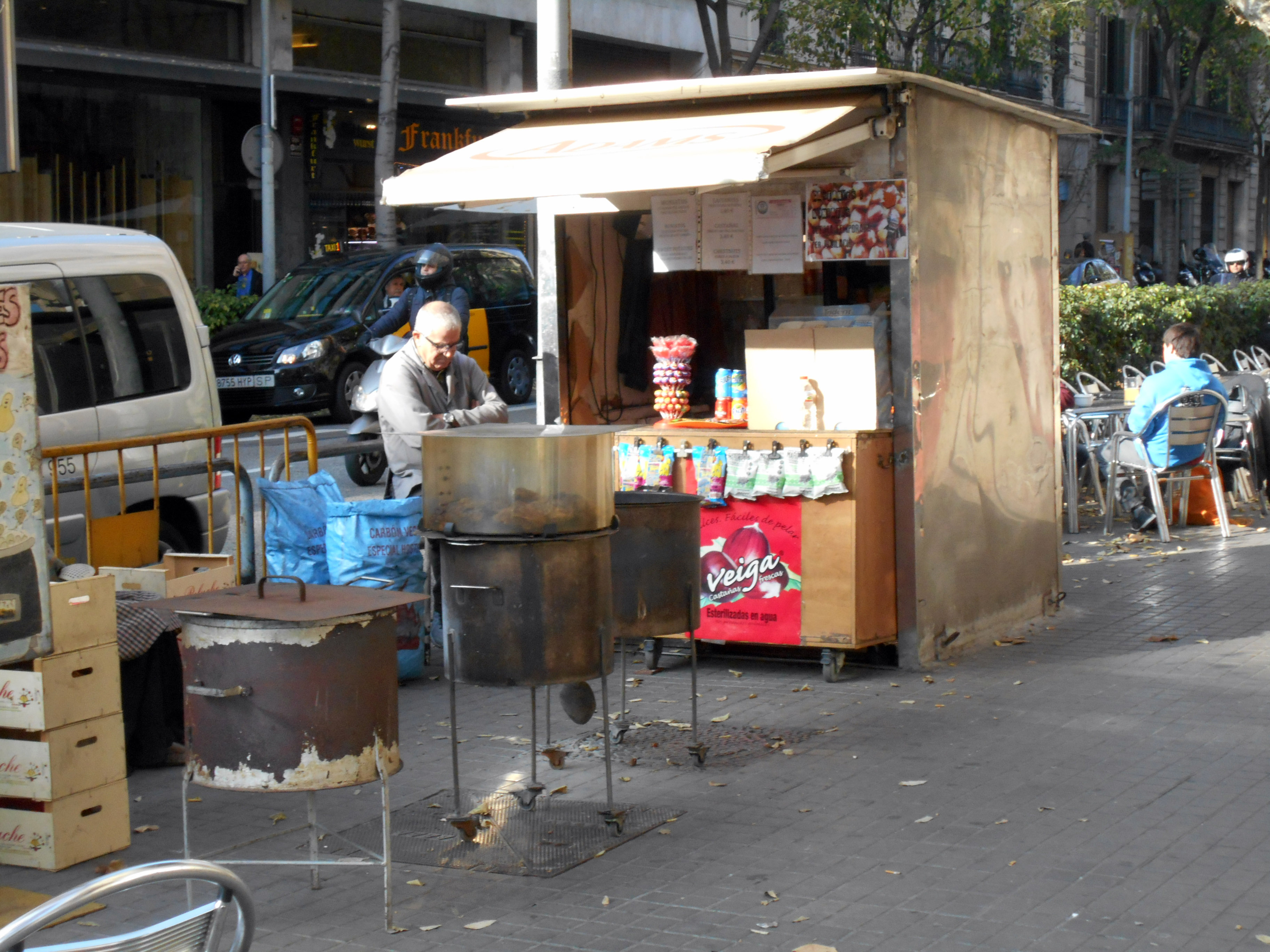
Chestnut stand.

== Historical evolution ==
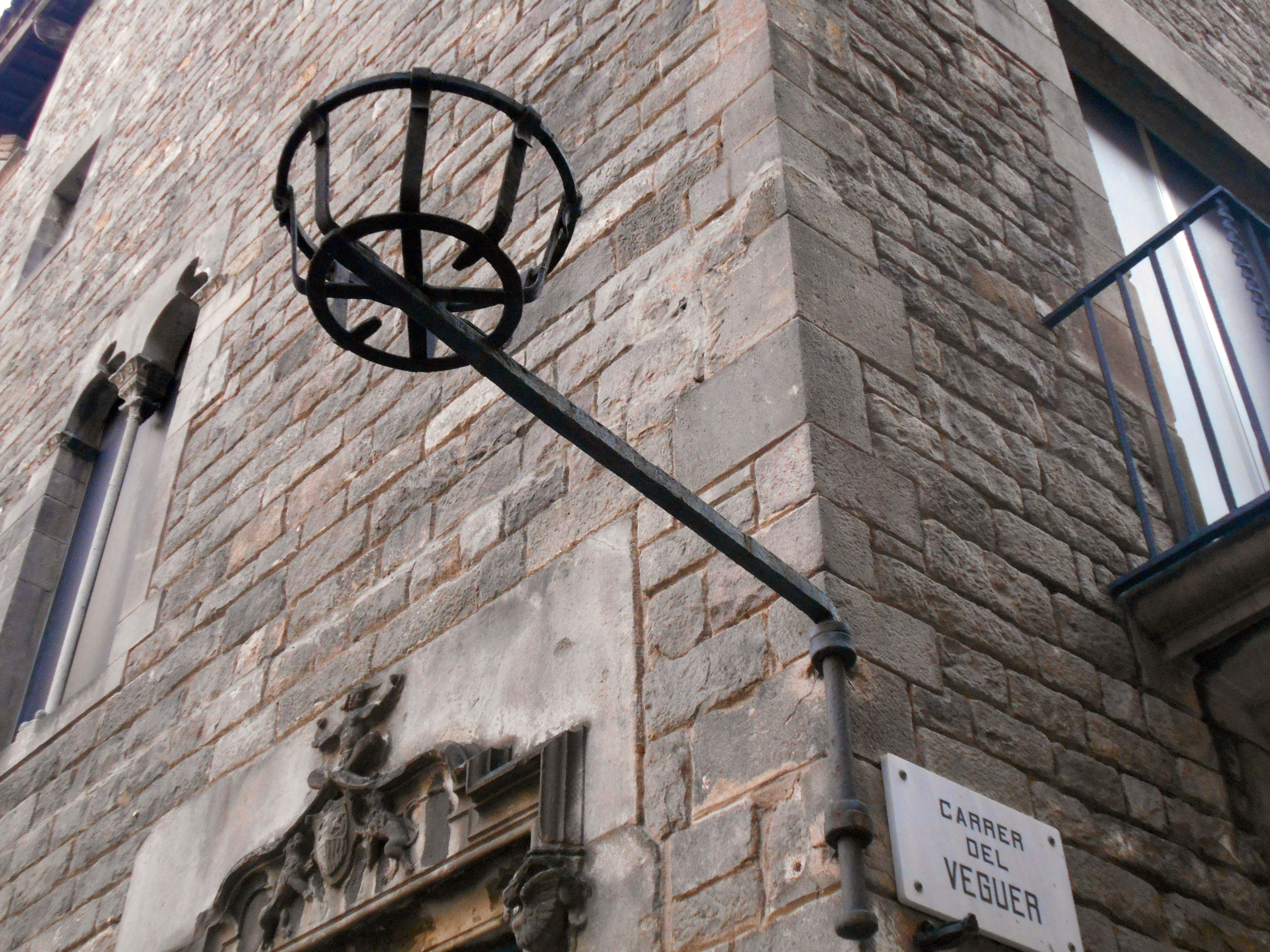
Tedero of Plaça del Rei.

=== Background ===
The concept of street furniture is relatively contemporary, so it cannot be extrapolated to past times, times in which no special interest was placed on the common elements of civic coexistence. From medieval or modern times there are still some fountains that, although they were for public use, were of individualized construction, so we cannot speak of a systematized project to regulate their use and distribution. Some examples are: the fountain of Santa Ana, in the avenue of Portal de l'Àngel with Cucurulla (1356); the fountain of San Justo, in the square of the same name (1367); the fountain of Santa Maria, in the square of the same name (1403) and the fountain of Puertaferrisa, in the street of the same name (1680).

Another precedent of public lighting is nighttime illumination, which was carried out by means of tederos installed on public thoroughfares, with fuel made of resinous wood or pitch. In 1599 Barcelona had 60 tederos in its public streets, some of which are still preserved, such as those in the Plaça del Rei or in the church of Santa Maria del Mar. Later on, it evolved to lanterns of fuel oils, of which in 1752 there were 1500 scattered around the city; due to their cost, they were only lit on dark nights.

Attention to urban elements began incipiently in the 18th century, when the urban environment began to be considered worthy of beautification and accommodation of citizens' needs, and the regulation of aspects such as sewage and sanitation networks, or the separation between pedestrians and vehicular traffic, began.

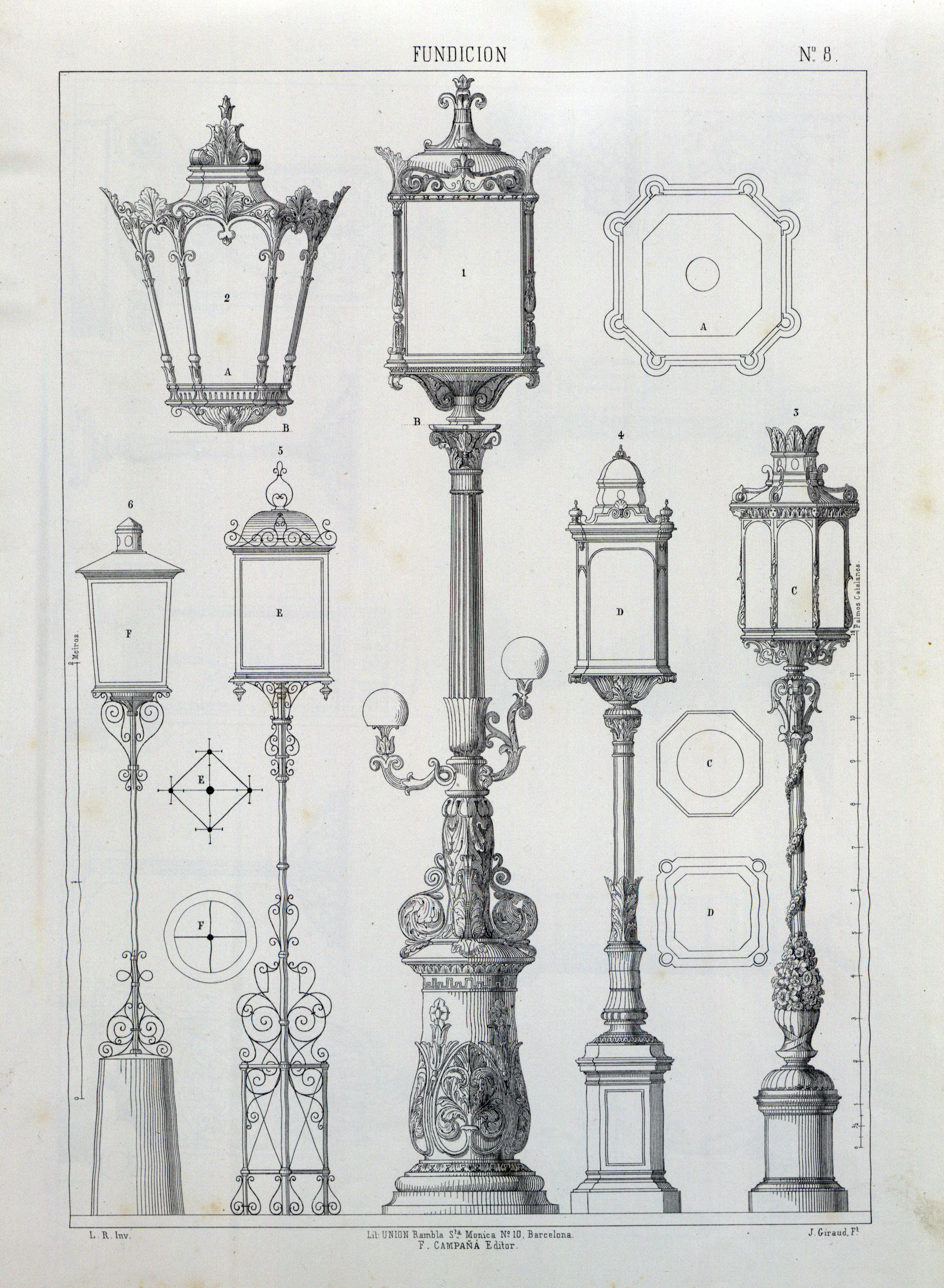
Models of street light, from the Album enciclopédico-pintoresco de los industriales (1857), by Lluís Rigalt.

However, it was in the 19th century when street furniture became an integral part of any urban planning process in the city and became the object of design and special planning for its construction according to pre-established needs and a predetermined location. This was especially helped by factors such as the new industrial manufacturing processes that emerged at that time and the use of materials such as iron, which allowed mass production and resulted in greater strength and durability.

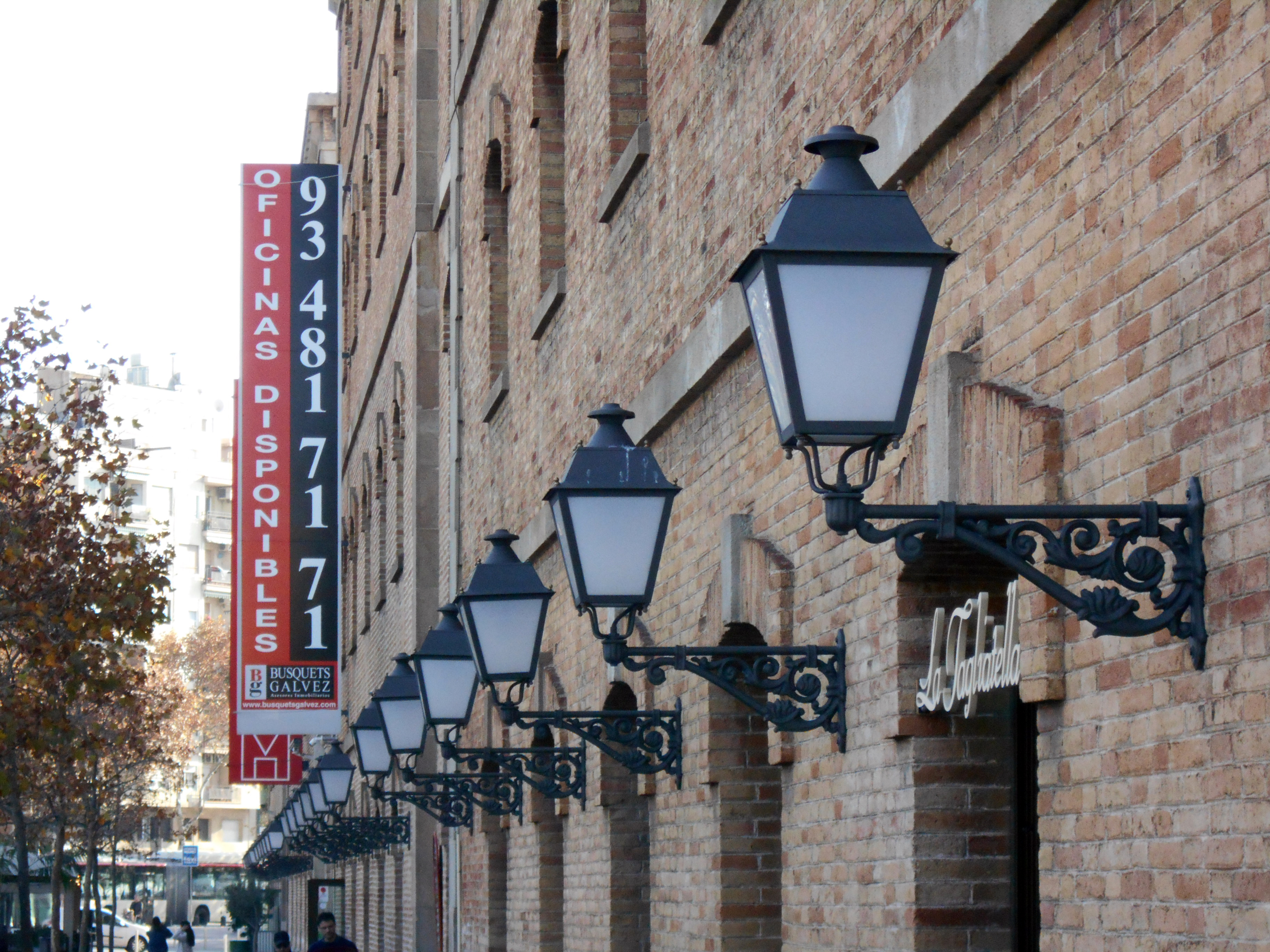
Montmartre type street light, one of the first models to be installed in Barcelona.

During that century, the definitive separation of public roads between the roadway and the sidewalk for pedestrians was established, which offered a perfect platform for the placement of a series of elements aimed at regulating civic activities and accommodating the space to the needs of the population. Among the first elements installed were benches, of which the first public ones were stone ones installed in the Paseo de San Juan (1797), the Garden of the General (1815) and various squares located in the lots left by burned or disentailed convents in 1835–1836; fountains, which proliferated at this time thanks to the canalization of the waters of Moncada by the Marquis of Campo Sagrado, although they were individualized fountains and were not yet built in series, as would later become common; and the kiosks, whether for the sale of newspapers, flowers, pets, lottery, drinks or other products –including occasional ones, such as firecrackers for the festival of San Juan, ice cream in summer or chestnuts in autumn– of which the most paradigmatic are those located on La Rambla, which appeared in the middle of the 19th century.

This hatching of urban elements was favored by the development of new technologies, such as gas lighting, initiated in 1842 by the company Sociedad Catalana para el Alumbrado por Gas, being the first Spanish city to use it. The first illuminated streets were La Rambla, Ferran street and San Jaime square. In 1845 there were already 500 gas lanterns, and at that date standing street lights appeared. In 1880 electric lighting appeared, gradually replacing gas lighting on public streets: in 1882 the first street lights were placed in the Plaça de Sant Jaume, and between 1887 and 1888 La Rambla and the Passeig de Colom were electrified. For a time, between 1885 and 1912, oil, gas and electric lights coexisted: in 1905 there were 711 oil, 13,378 gas and 228 electric streetlights; in 1913 oil disappeared, and in 1967 gas. The generalization of electric lighting did not take place until the beginning of the 20th century, with the invention of the light bulb, and was not completed until 1929.

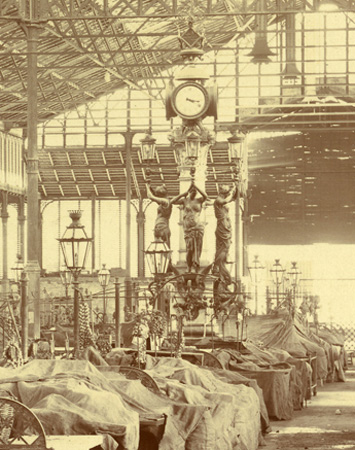
Fountain-farola-clock of the Mercat del Born, by Josep Fontserè i Mestre (1875).

In Barcelona, as in the rest of Europe and unlike American cities, street furniture was controlled exclusively by the city council, which established careful regulations for its installation. The new urban products were entering the market through catalogs or their diffusion in the international exhibitions that used to take place at that time, such as the one held in Barcelona in 1888. Companies such as the French Durenne or Val d'Osne, or the German Mannesmann, placed their products all over Europe, and helped to make urban furniture a fashionable object of both practical and aesthetic appreciation.

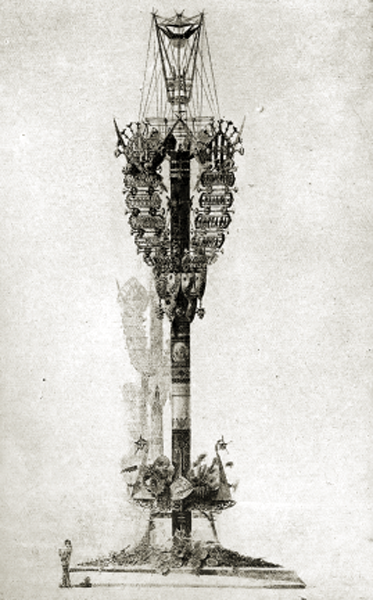
Street light project for the Muralla de Mar (1880), by Antoni Gaudí.

The introduction of street furniture in Barcelona was favored by Ildefons Cerdà, who in his Cerdà Plan already included many of these elements as integral parts of the urban fabric. This was probably influenced by his visit to Paris, where elements such as kiosks, clocks, fountains and other urban elements were common and were the object of special planning. The Parisian influence was preponderant in this first stage of Barcelona's street furniture, not only in terms of inspiration but also in terms of specific commissions from French companies, such as the Ville de Paris-type street lights commissioned in 1866 from the Val d'Osne foundry, or the Montmartre-type wall lanterns with lanterns, of which there are still several in the old quarter.

Another pioneer in the introduction of street furniture was Josep Fontserè, author of the project of the Parc de la Ciutadella (1872), which included some innovative design elements, some of which were designed by his assistant, a young Antoni Gaudí who worked as a draughtsman to pay for his studies. His work was also a fountain-fountain-clock in the Mercat del Born (1875), made of cast iron; it had a base with a fountain with spouts coming out of swan figures, on which were four sculptures of nereids holding gas lanterns, with a clock on top. This design was very similar to the crowning of a monumental fountain designed by Gaudí for the Plaça de Catalunya as a degree project for the 1876–1877 academic year at the Barcelona School of Architecture, which suggests that it could have been the work of the architect from Reus, who at that time was working as a draughtsman for Fontserè.

Gaudí himself was responsible for one of his first projects, the Girossi kiosks, a commission from a merchant that would have consisted of twenty kiosks scattered throughout Barcelona, each of which would have included public toilets, a flower stall and glass panels for advertising, as well as a clock, calendar, barometer and thermometer; however, it was never realized. Another unrealized project of Gaudí's was the electric lighting for the Muralla de Mar (1880), which would have consisted of eight large iron street light decorated with plant motifs, friezes, coats of arms and names of battles and Catalan admirals. Even so, the modernist architect made two models of street light that still survive: those of the Plaça Reial (1878) and those of Pla de Palau (1889).

On the other hand, in the field of design, it is worth mentioning the collection of drawings entitled Álbum enciclopédico-pintoresco de los industriales (1857), by Lluís Rigalt, a compendium of drawings of various industrial designs made at the time in the fields of gardening, casting, marble and stone work, cabinetmaking, jewelry, architecture and applied arts.

=== Development and planning ===
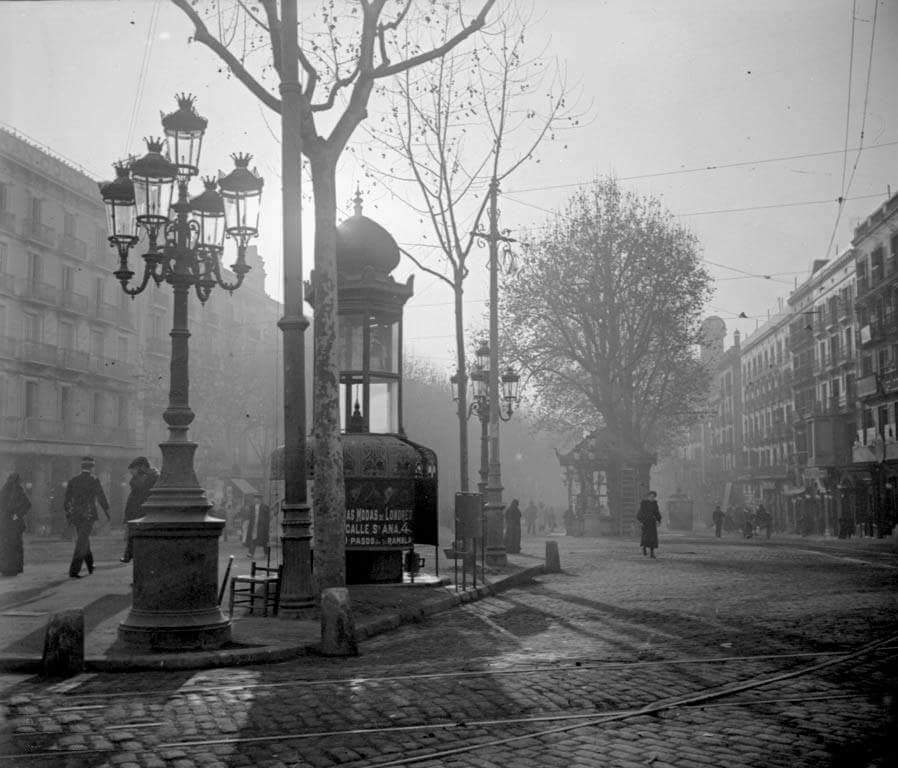
Vespasian type urinal, crossing of Pelai street with Plaça de Catalunya.

Despite these early precedents, street furniture did not begin to be systematically planned until the appointment in 1871 of Antoni Rovira i Trias as head of Buildings and Ornamentation of the City Council. This architect was the first to make a special effort to combine aesthetics and functionality for this type of urban adornment. Until the year of his death in 1889, he was responsible for a large number of products installed on the public streets. Some of them were imported, generally from France: in 1876 he replaced the fountain in the Plaça Reial with an ornamental fountain manufactured by the French company Durenne, the Three Graces Fountain; in 1877 he began the installation of public urinals also of Parisian origin known as vespasian (vespasienne), made of metal with a circular body with a capacity for six people, above which rose a hexagonal section for advertising, crowned by a cupulite. However, he also personally designed a large number of these elements: in 1875 he designed an iron and palaster table for the sale of flowers on La Rambla, where he also placed a wooden kiosk for drinks in 1877, the Canaletes kiosk; In 1877 he designed a fountain for the Plaça de Jonqueres that later spread throughout the city, made in series by La Maquinista Terrestre y Marítima; in 1882 he placed some public urinals on the Paseo Nacional (now Paseo de Juan de Borbón), and the following year he designed another model of urinal inspired by a model of the New York firm Mott Iron Works, which was distributed throughout the city; between 1882 and 1886 he designed the railing over the retaining walls of the railroad ditch in Aragón street, as well as the railings, stone benches, street light and iron jugs of the Passeig de Colom; and in 1886 he was also in charge of the railings, ornamental jugs and finishing details of the Salón de San Juan (today's Passeig de Lluís Companys).

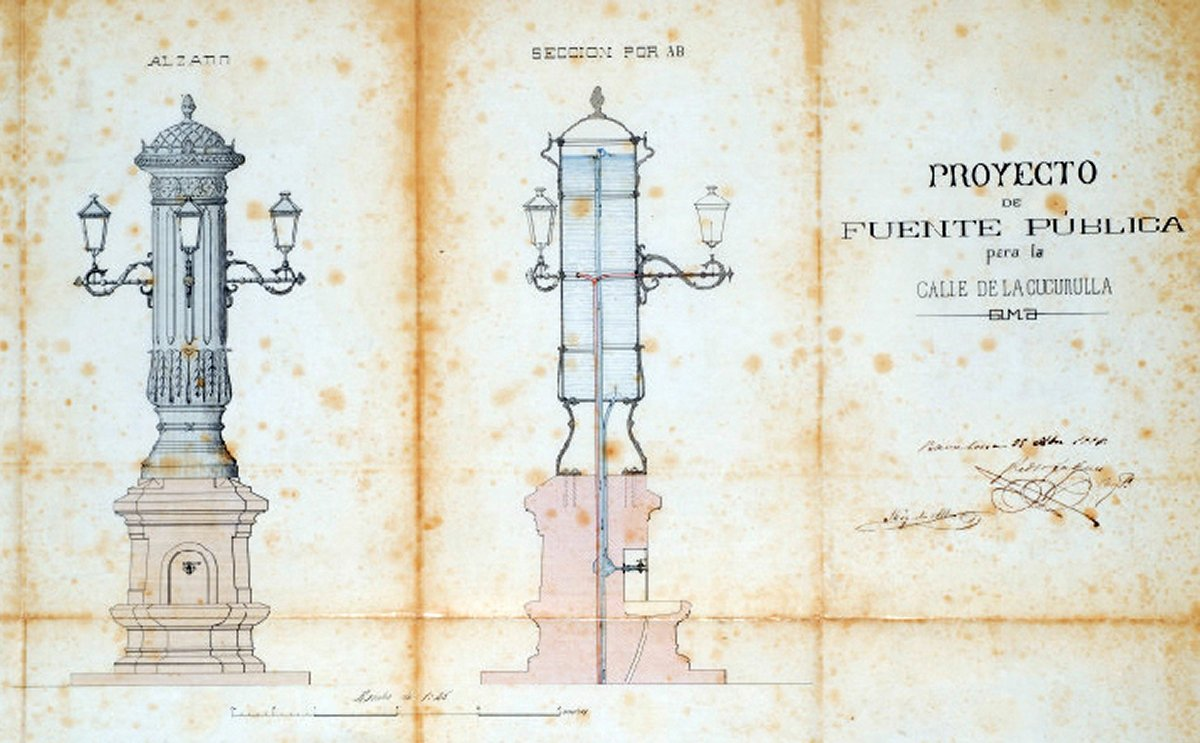
Project for a public fountain for Cucurulla street (1886), by Pere Falqués.

Rovira's successor was Pere Falqués, who continued to embellish the city with original designs of great artistic value, in keeping with the modernist style in vogue at the time. Thus, in 1889 he designed a fountain-farola for Canaletes, at the beginning of the Rambla near the Plaça de Catalunya, which has become an icon of the city; the model was later extended to other places in the municipality. Near the Canaletes fountain he installed in 1890 a kiosk for drinks, which replaced Rovira's wooden one. In 1893 he designed another fountain-farola for the Plaça de Sant Pere, of Gothic inspiration. In 1896 he designed a kiosk for resting and stopping cars with a clock and public telephone, located on the corner of Gran Vía and Paseo de Gracia. In 1905 he designed the Bancs-Fanals of Paseo de Gracia, as well as the street lights of Plaça del Cinc d'Oros, which today are located on Gaudí Avenue.

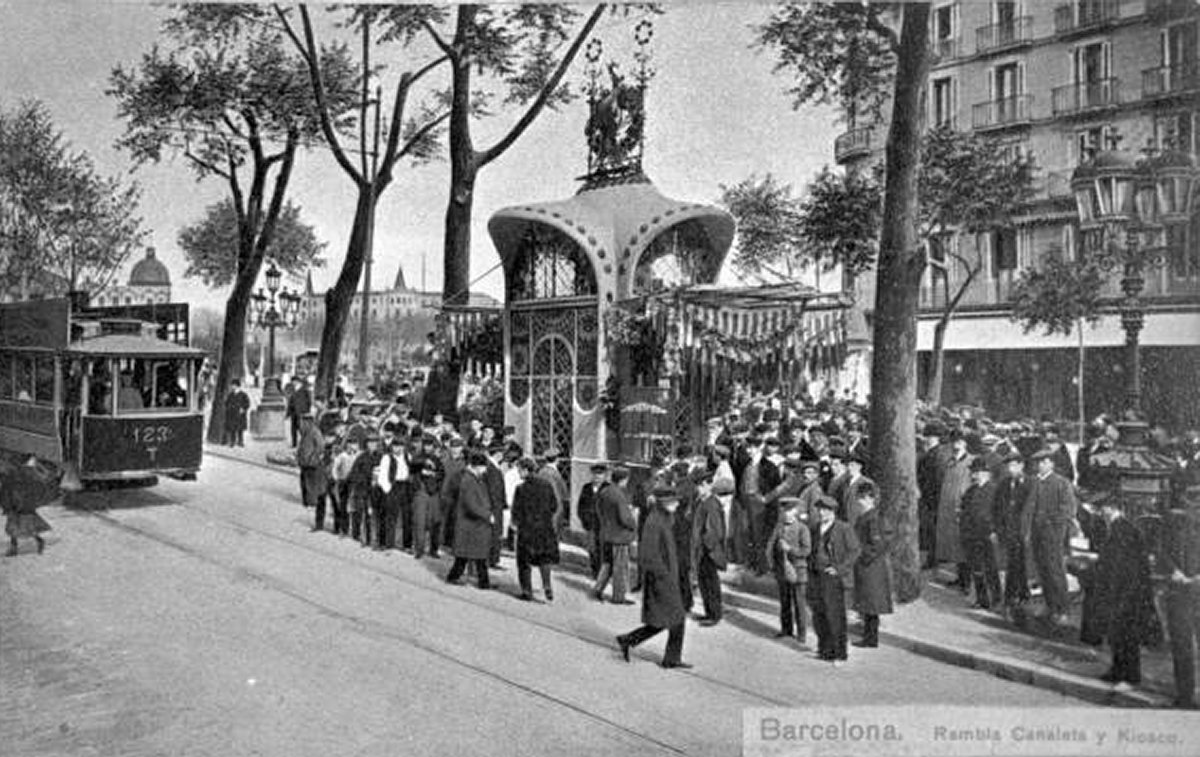
Canaletes stand in 1909.

During this period, numerous models of wall lanterns, column lanterns and candelabras appeared, with different technologies that evolved from gas to electricity. Wall street lights were available with lanterns (square or hexagonal) or with a hanging globe (one, two or three); street lights could have a column and lantern luminaire (circular, square or hexagonal), globe or with a "lyre" type top; and candelabras could have from two to six lanterns, circular, hexagonal or lyre. There was also a model of column lantern with a built-in mailbox, located on the Via Layetana and disappeared in 1913. Other models had supports for tram cables for a time.

At the end of the 19th century the streets began to be urbanized with flagstone sidewalks and cobblestone sidewalks, which were replaced in the 1960s by asphalt. The cobblestones were usually made of Montjuic stone, 25 cm in diameter, while the sidewalk tiles were usually made of cement mortar, in 20 x 20 cm tiles, with various designs including one with flowers created by Josep Puig i Cadafalch or one with marine motifs created by Antoni Gaudí (Gaudí tile). In 1906 the City Council approved six types of sidewalk tiles, made from 1916 by the Escofet company, made of hydraulic cement. In 1916 tiles with letters also appeared, which allowed the names of the streets to be written on the sidewalks; they stopped being installed in the 1960s, since when they have gradually disappeared, although there are still some examples, such as in Londres and París streets.

=== Maintenance and mass production ===
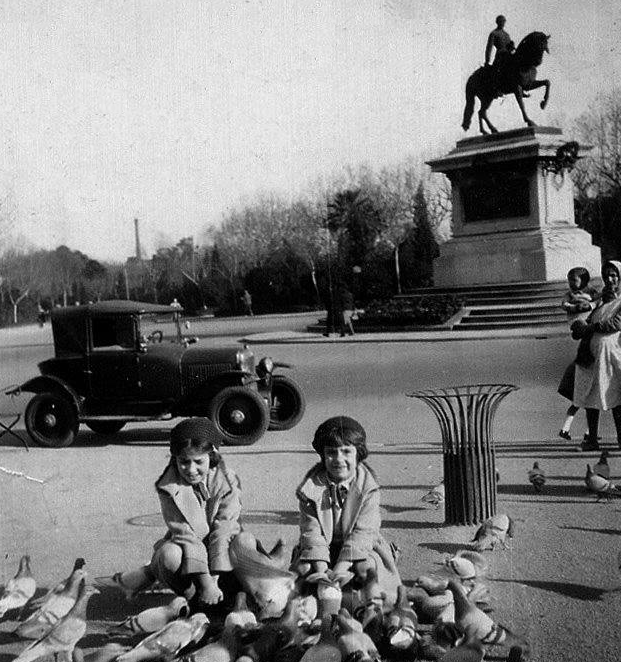
Tulipa litter garbage can, bottom right.

After the period of splendor of urban furniture led by Rovira and Falqués, the successive city councils that governed the city did not take a special interest in this field, beyond the maintenance of existing elements or their replacement by others of little creativity. Occasional exceptions were the urbanization of Avinguda Diagonal or the renovation of the urban landscape for the 1929 International Exposition.

In the 1920s, several subway public toilets were installed to replace the unhygienic Vespasian toilets, such as those in Plaça Catalunya, Plaça Urquinaona and Plaça Teatro. Those in Plaça Urquinaona (1920-1998) also included showers and various services, such as a hairdresser, manicurist, bootblack, perfumery and notary, as well as a lottery stand and payphone.

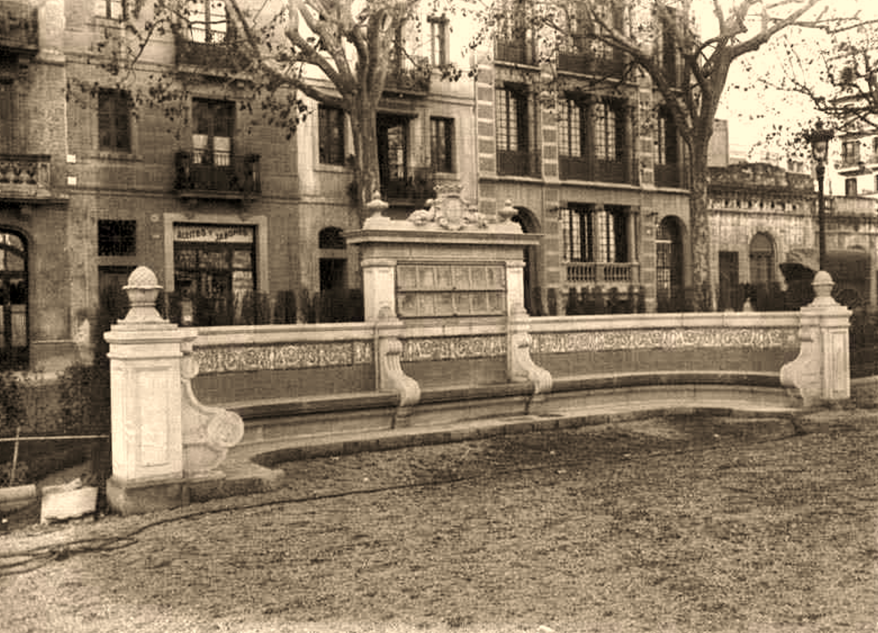
Bench-library in Paseo de San Juan.

In 1928, with a view to the celebration of the International Exposition, the first public waste container were installed, the Tulipa model, consisting of a metal cylinder with vertical bars that opened like a flower at the top. They were a novelty at the time, since the awareness of street cleanliness was not very well developed at that time. For the Exposition, some temporary street lights called "dancer" were also installed in the middle of the streets, suspended from cables with tensors placed from façade to façade. After the event they were removed, although in 1990 some were reinstalled on Avinguda del Tibidabo.

In 1929 the first traffic lights were installed to regulate vehicular traffic: the first was located at the intersection of Balmes and Provenza streets, and by the end of the year there were ten operating throughout the city, regulated by agents of the Guardia Urbana. The Civil War meant a halt in the installation of traffic lights, which was reactivated in the 1950s. In 1958 the first synchronization took place, in Via Layetana. In 1984 the Traffic Control Center was opened, which in 2004 controlled 1,500 traffic light crossings.(88)

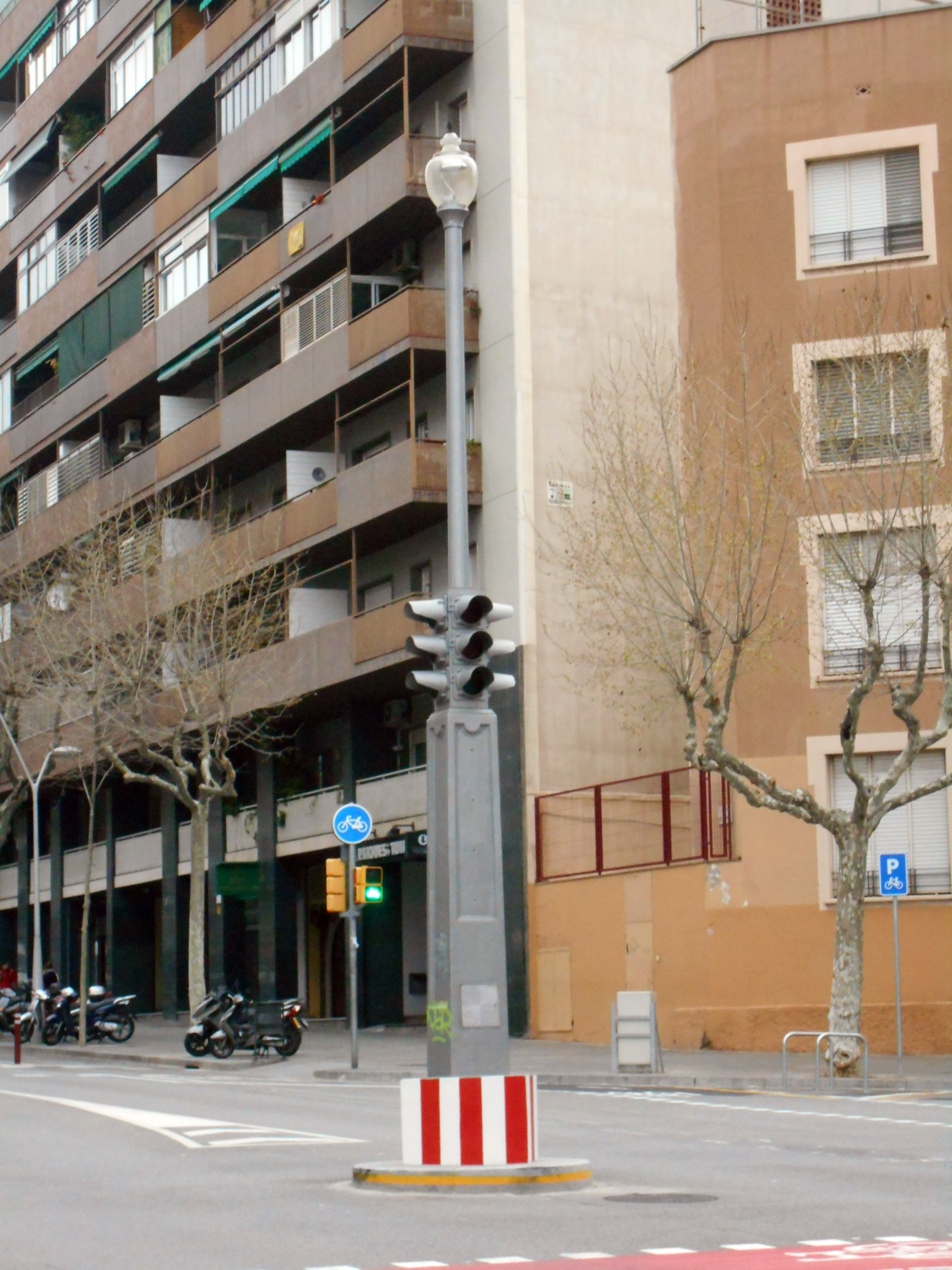
Four-wind traffic light at the Conde de Urgel/Londres street intersection, of a series that operated throughout the city between 1953 and 1968 and of which only two remain in operation, at Urgel and Londres and Buenos Aires.89

In 1930 some curious benches designed by Félix de Azúa were installed on the Paseo de San Juan that contained books inside, the so-called "library benches", which had glass cases on their central backrest inside which housed books for free reading, dispensed by a civil servant. After the Civil War the benches lost this function, and in the 1950s they disappeared in a renovation of the promenade.

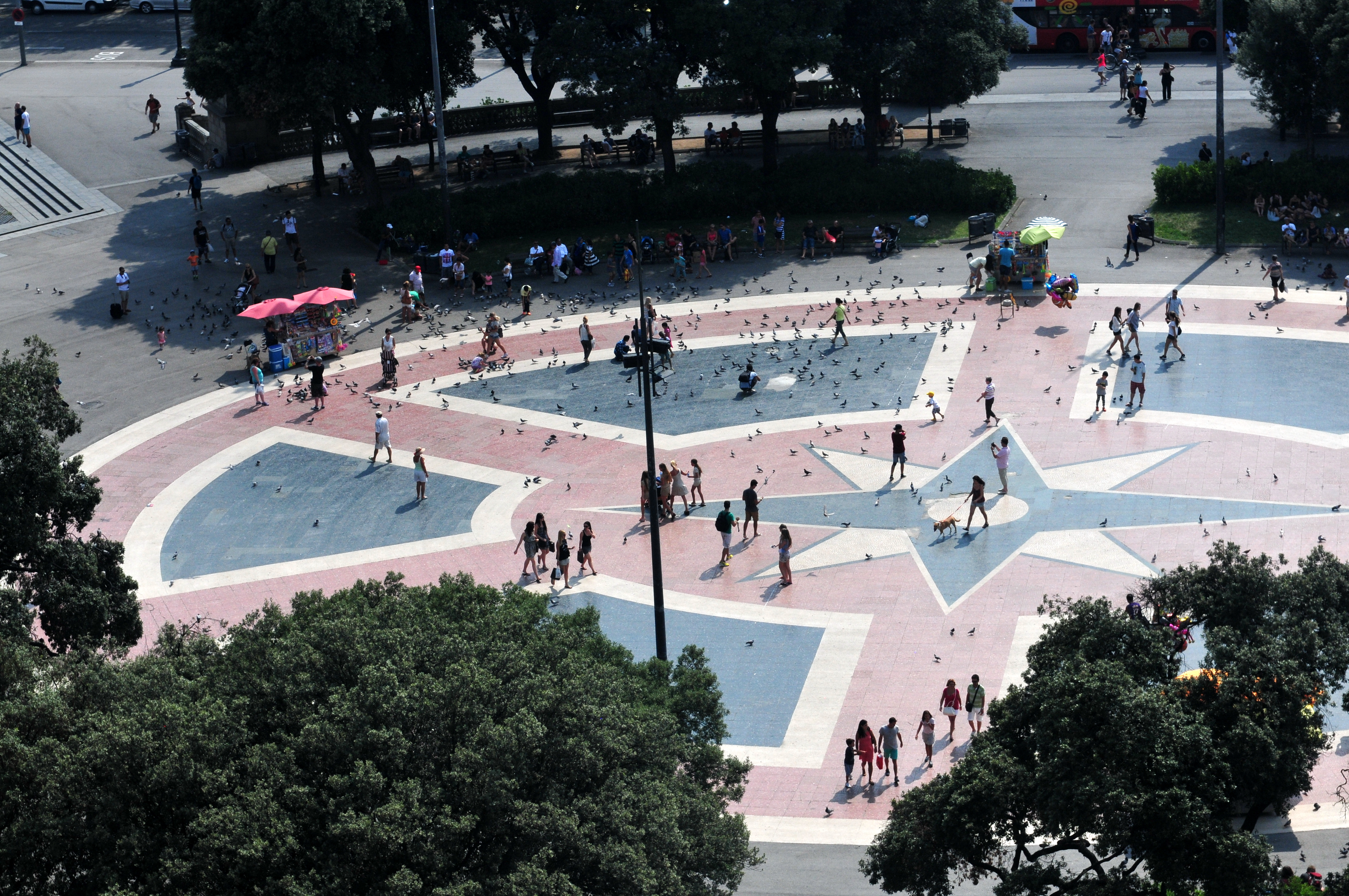
Pavement of Plaça de Catalunya.

During the Franco era, pragmatic and economic criteria predominated over aesthetic ones, together with a lack of coordination in the placement of these elements in the public space. Among the few novelties in these years, we can mention the continuous jet fountains, of which there were two main varieties: between 1940 and 1960 several fountains of artificial stone were installed, with a tripartite base, octagonal shaft and circular bowl with floral reliefs, from which a vertical jet fell into the same bowl; the second was between 1960 and 1970, made of pink conglomerate, with a circular base and conical section shaft.

During the 1950s and 1960s, the municipal architect Adolf Florensa put special emphasis on the design of new pavements for various areas of the city, especially in the Ciutat Vella district. The result was the Pavement of several emblematic places in the city: that of Plaça Sant Jaume (1953), made with dark basalt in combination with white limestone, which forms a grid of squares that inscribe a rectangle on the perimeter of the square; that of Plaça de Catalunya (1959), which with terrazzo slabs of different colors (white, maroon, green and cream) forms an oval pattern with six trapezoids inside and a star or wind rose in the center; and the Pavement of La Rambla, made with vibrazo of undulating shapes (1968).

In 1974 a renovation of Passeig de Gràcia was carried out in which garden benches made of trencadís ceramics were added, in imitation of the modernist benches designed by Pere Falqués. That same year Òscar Tusquets and Lluís Clotet designed the Catalano model bench, made of steel, with a deployé seat painted with silver-colored polyester resin, and with an ergonomic profile inspired by the undulating bench in Park Güell designed by Gaudí; it was the first exponent of a change of attitude and a commitment to design and innovation in urban furniture.

=== Innovation and design ===
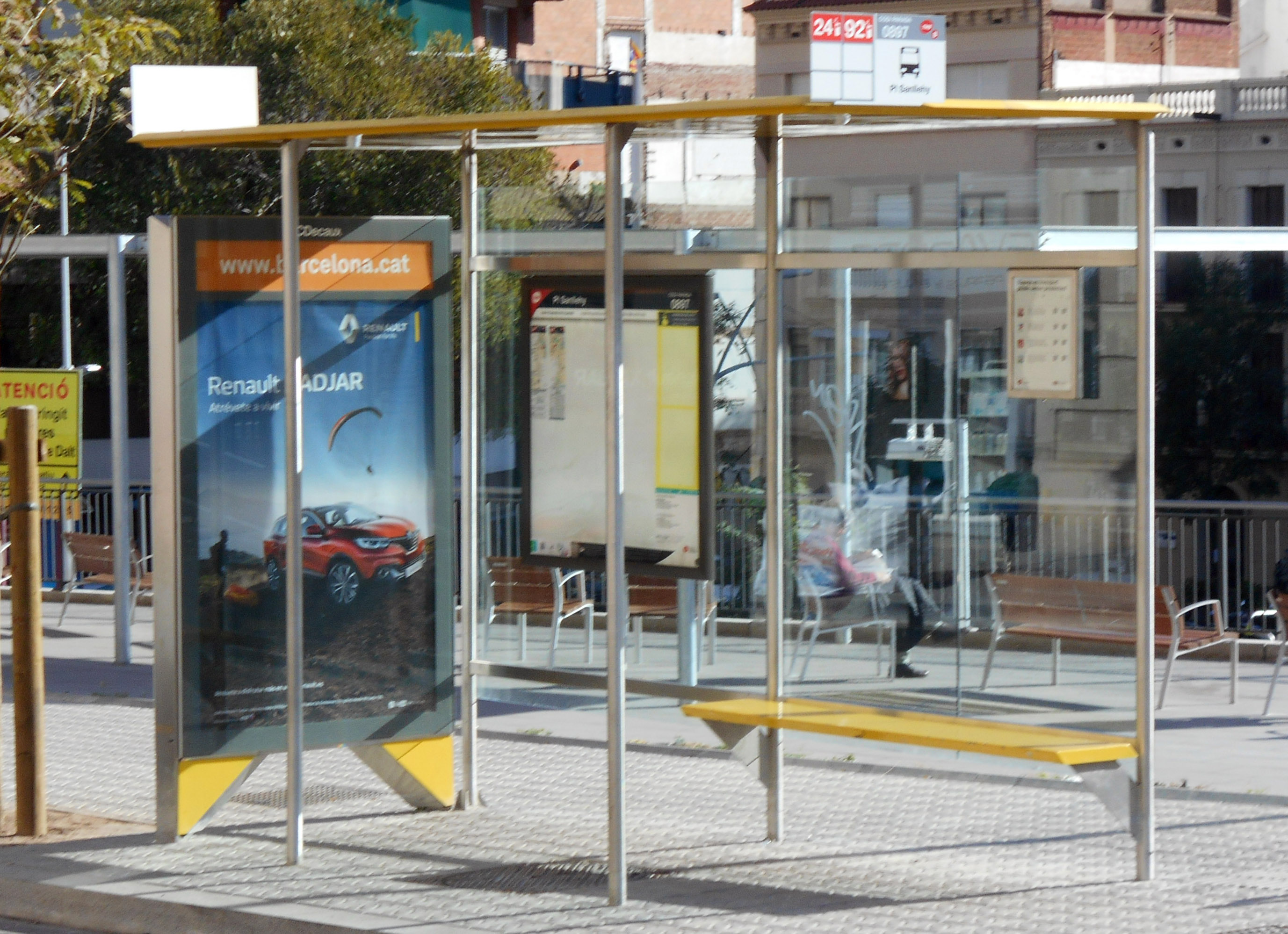
Pal-li model marquee, by Josep Lluís Canosa, Elías Torres and José Antonio Martínez Lapeña.

The situation changed with the arrival of democracy and the new socialist governments in the city, which bet on art and design as a sign of the city's identity. A campaign was then launched both to recover the historical heritage and to install new elements in which design predominated as a defining factor of the new urban complements. To this end, the Urban Elements Service was created in 1991, under the Projects and Works Department of the Barcelona City Council, whose main objectives were to establish criteria for the selection, placement, standardization and renovation of urban elements with a clear commitment to design and modernity. Three main guidelines were adopted: to recover the old designs originating in the 19th century, such as romantic benches, cast iron fountains and street lights; to take the municipal initiative as the main promoter of urban projects; and to design specific urban furniture for each project, as one more element of any urban intervention. At the head of the new department was Màrius Quintana, responsible for the selection of urban furniture and its awarding through public tenders to new designs by the most prestigious architects and designers. The urban projects of this period, according to Quintana, "signified an increase in the level of design and a commitment to modernity and innovation in both spaces and urban furniture".

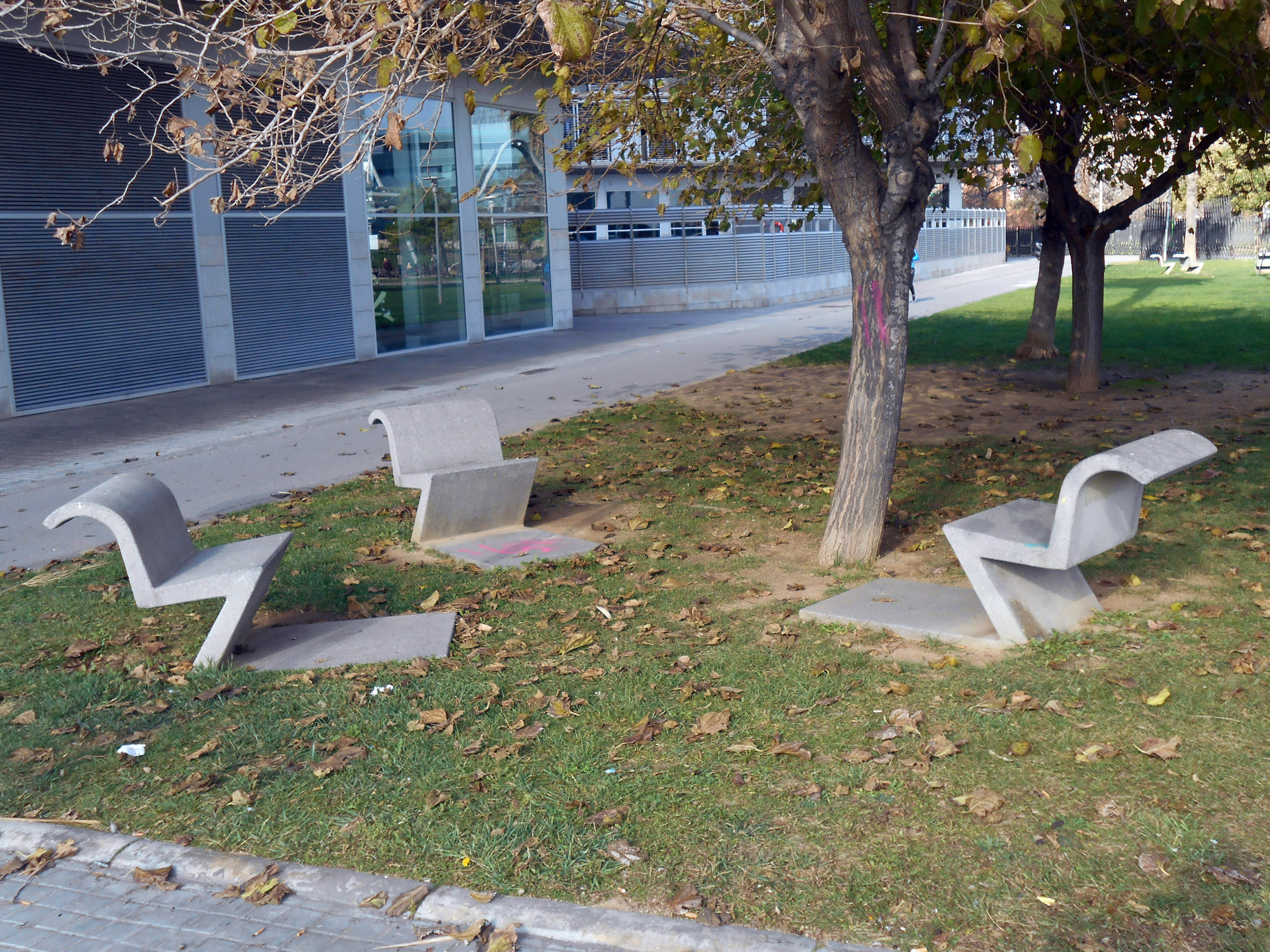
Benches model U, by Albert Viaplana and Helio Piñón.

A clear example was the award in 1986 of the new bus shelters (Pal-li model) for bus stops to the design by Josep Lluís Canosa, Elías Torres and José Antonio Martínez Lapeña, a practical but at the same time innovative, aesthetic and contemporary design. Shaped like a baldachin, they consist of a tubular steel structure with a roof and a yellow polyester bench. This model also combined functionality with economy, since the incorporation of advertising –thanks to Jean-Claude Decaux's idea– made it possible to pay for its maintenance, in a perfect combination that was extended to other elements of the city.

Since then, many architects and designers have created different models of street furniture for the city: Jaume Bach and Gabriel Mora (Barcina planter, 1982); Beth Galí (Lamparaalta street light, 1983, with Màrius Quintana); Antoni Roselló (Marítim model of ONCE kiosk, 1986); Jordi Henrich and Olga Tarrasó (Pep street light, 1988; Nu bench, 1991); Albert Viaplana and Helio Piñón (U bench, 1988); Josep Maria Civit (Telefónica call shop, 1989); Jaume Artigues (Levit bench, 1989); Leopoldo Milá Sagnier (Montseny bench, 1990); Pedro Barragán (Prim street light, 1991); Enric Batlle and Joan Roig (Atlantida fountain, 1991); Montserrat Periel (Linea railing, 1993); Andreu Arriola and Carme Fiol (G bench, 1995; Sarastro fountain, 1995); Enric Pericas (Bus Platform, 1995); Moisés Gallego and Franc Fernández (Condal newsstand, 1996); Norman Foster (Foster canopy, 1998); Elías Torres and José Antonio Martínez Lapeña (Lama fountain, 2004); Terradas Arquitectes (Diagonal tile, 2014); etc.

One of the most important factors considered in the design of urban furniture in recent years has been accessibility criteria, for the elimination of architectural barriers that hindered the transit of people with physical disabilities, or the installation of special signage for the blind. Another important factor has been the criteria of sustainability, energy efficiency and respect for the environment. An example of this has been the new bus stops introduced in 2010 that incorporate a solar panel, the so-called "solar information stop" (PSI), which incorporates a digital panel that works with GPS to display the waiting time of the buses.

== Highlights ==
Name	Author	Date	Description	Photo
Wallace fountain	Charles-Auguste Lebourg	1872	In 1872 the fountains known as Wallace fountains were installed in different parts of the city, made by Charles-Auguste Lebourg commissioned by the English philanthropist Sir Richard Wallace, and spread throughout many European cities as an act of brotherhood. In Barcelona there are two of the initial dozen: on La Rambla (touching the passage of the Bank) and on the Gran Via corner with Passeig de Gracia. All of them have four figures of caryatids holding a hemispherical dome with four fish on top, between which falls a stream of water. In 1999, several replicas of these fountains were installed on La Rambla (in front of Plaça Reial), Gran Via corner with Marina and Diagonal corner with Roger de Flor, made in series and of poorer quality.	
Three Graces Fountain	Antoine Durenne	1876	The Three Graces Fountain, designed by architect Antoni Rovira i Trias based on an original design by Antoine Durenne, inspired in turn by figures by Germain Pilon made around 1560 and preserved in the Louvre Museum, representing the Three Graces, was located in the Royal Square in 1876. It consists of a circular basin in the center of which stands a cup with six masks spouting water, above which are placed the three statues that give it its name, topped by another upper cup.	
Candelabra of the Citadel Park	Antoni Gaudí	1876-1877	In his student days, Gaudí worked as a draughtsman for Josep Fontserè, author of the project of the Parc de la Ciutadella. Apparently, under his guidelines, the modernist genius designed the entrance gate to the park, which included wrought iron candelabra with an elaborate design: at the base there are reliefs of lions, on which stands the shaft of the candelabra with the coat of arms of Barcelona and a set of seven or eight globes of light, on which stands a mast topped by a helmet with a crown and a bat. Today they are in rather poor condition.	
Street lights in Plaça Reial	Antoni Gaudí	1878	Gaudí was commissioned to design street lights for the Plaça Reial in February 1878, when he had passed his architect's degree but had not yet been awarded his diploma, which he received in March of that year. They are two wrought-iron street lights with a marble base, six arms, and a decoration with the coat of arms of Barcelona and a crown with two coiled snakes and a winged helmet, representing the caduceus of Mercury, symbol of commerce.	
Masts of the Universal Exposition of 1888	Antoni Rovira i Trias	1888	This is a set of four masts located in front of the Arc de Triomf, at the beginning of the Saló de Sant Joan (now Passeig de Lluís Companys), which was the main entrance to the site of the 1888 Exposition. Made of iron, the lower part shows the coat of arms of Barcelona, while the upper part has a crown and a helmet.	
Street light in Pla de Palau	Antoni Gaudí	1889	In addition to the street lights in Plaça Reial, Gaudí designed another model for Pla de Palau, of which there are two surviving examples located next to the Old Customs House of Barcelona (now the Government Delegation), while the other two next to the Faculty of Nautical Studies have disappeared. They are made of wrought iron and are a simplified version of those in the Plaça Reial, with only three arms and a top in the form of an inverted crown with two snake heads.	
Canaletes Fountain	Pere Falqués	1892	Located on La Rambla with the Plaça de Catalunya, it is one of the most famous fountains in Barcelona. It is part of a set of four lantern-fountains located in various parts of the city, a project that was commissioned to Pere Falqués; later the project was extended to fourteen fountains, awarded to Jaume Rodelles. Made of cast iron, the fountain has a circular base on which rises a cup-shaped structure with four faucets that pour water over four circular basins; above this cup rises a column topped by four lanterns.	
Fountain-street light in St. Peter's Square	Pere Falqués	1893-1896	Located in front of Sant Pere de les Puelles, it is made of wrought iron, in the neo-Gothic modernist style, with a circular base on which stands a structure formed by four arms with a central column containing four taps that pour water over an equally circular basin; the upper part has a plaque with the name of the square and the coat of arms of the city, as well as two lateral lamps.	
Gaudi Tile	Antoni Gaudí	1904	Gaudí designed for the Batlló house a type of hexagonal hydraulic mosaic tiles to be placed on the pavement of the street, although it was not installed in time and was finally used in his next work, the Milà house. It is decorated with marine motifs (seaweed, starfish and ammonoidea), and was manufactured by the Escofet company. This tile was later chosen to pave Barcelona's Passeig de Gràcia.	
Street lights of Passeig de Lluís Companys	Pere Falqués	1906	Located in the Salón de San Juan (now Passeig de Lluís Companys), between the Arc de Triomf and the Parc de la Ciutadella, these street light were designed by Falqués along with those of Passeig de Gràcia and Cinco de Oros. There are a total of eleven street light, made of wrought iron on a stone base. As in the Paseo de Gracia, they combine two functions, that of a bench to sit on and that of illumination. Above the benches, separated by volutes, rises a fluted column, from which rise the iron elements, composed of two diagonal arms and a central mast decorated with vegetal reliefs.	
Passeig de Gràcia's benches and street lights	Pere Falqués	1906	Within the commissioning of various street light, these are the closest to modernism, while those of Cinco de Oros are more classical, and those of Passeig Lluís Companys are a mixture of both. The base is a limestone bench with trencadís ceramic cladding, with undulating and organic forms, denoting Gaudí's influence. Above this rises the wrought iron lantern, with a French-Belgian Art Nouveau-inspired coup de fuet design, with a sinuous L-shaped line at the end of which hangs the lantern, a plant-like decoration and a finial with the coat of arms of Barcelona, a crown and a bat.	
Street lights on Gaudi Avenue	Pere Falqués	1906	The third commission for Falqués was for street lights for the plaça del Cinc d'Oros, at the intersection of Passeig de Gràcia and Avinguda Diagonal. It was a set of five street light arranged around a traffic circle located in the center of the square, so it received the nickname "five of golds", as in aerial view reminiscent of that playing card. Its design was more classicist than the others, with a limestone base on which rises the four-armed wrought iron street light, topped by a high pinnacle of Gothic appearance. The increase in traffic at this central intersection led to the removal of the street light, which were later relocated on Avinguda de Gaudí, between the Sagrada Familia and the Hospital de Sant Pau.	
Undulating bench in Park Güell	Antoni Gaudí and Josep Maria Jujol	1907-1913	This bench is located in the central square of the park, and undulates like a snake 110 m long. It is covered with small pieces of ceramic and glass, in a technique known as trencadís. It is formed by a succession of concave and convex modules of 1.5 m, with an ergonomic design adapted to the human body. The base is made of white trencadís, and is crowned with a ceramic decoration reminiscent of dada or surrealist collages, with generally abstract motifs, but also some figurative elements, such as the signs of the Zodiac, stars, flowers, fish, crabs, etc. The trencadís were built with waste materials, tiles, bottles and pieces of crockery. The colors blue, green and yellow predominate, which for Gaudí symbolized Faith, Hope and Charity. Jujol also included roses and allegorical phrases in homage to the Virgin Mary, in Catalan and Latin.	
Eixample Fountains	Various authors	1911-1925	During the years 1910 and 1920 numerous fountains were installed in the Eixample district, promoted by the Eixample Commission, which held several competitions to place various ornamental fountains. In 1911 three fountains were placed by Josep Campeny: the Trinxa fountain, the fountain of the Young Man of the Pitchers and the fountain of the Frog. The second competition was awarded in 1913 to Eduard B. Alentorn, author of three other fountains: fountain of the Palangana (or Negrito), fountain of the Labradora and fountain of the Tortuga. The third competition was held in 1920, when only one fountain was approved, the Sardana fountain by Frederic Marès. In 1921 two fountains were commissioned, the Caperucita fountain, by Josep Tenas, and the Efebo fountain, by Àngel Tarrach. Finally, in 1925, two more fountains were approved, commissioned to Frederic Marès: the Rooster and the Duck.	
Canaletes Street light	Félix de Azúa de Pastors	1928	In 1928 the Canaletes street light was placed, located at the beginning of La Rambla touching the Catalonia Square, near the fountain of the same name. Of the eight that were planned for the square, only this one was built. It consists of a granite column with a central bronze body with four lanterns on bodies in the shape of a ship's prow and four statuettes of winged victories, and crowned by a lantern in the shape of a sphere in a style close to art deco.	
Queen Maria Cristina Avenue	Josep Puig i Cadafalch, Guillemo Busquets, Carles Buïgas, Jean-Claude Nicolas Forestier and Marià Rubió i Bellver	1929	Avinguda de la Reina Maria Cristina is located at the foot of Montjuïc mountain, between the Plaça d'Espanya and Plaça de Carles Buïgas, where the Magic Fountain of Montjuïc is located. It was urbanized by Josep Puig i Cadafalch and Guillem Busquets with a view to the celebration of the 1929 Barcelona International Exposition. It was designed as a monumental avenue of access to the fairgrounds where they highlighted a set of water fountains, designed by Carles Buïgas, and vitrolux type street light, glass columns illuminated by electric light of different colors, art deco style, designed by Jean-Claude Nicolas Forestier and made by the engineer Marià Rubió i Bellver. Known as "asparagus", these luminaires were removed in 1936.	
Pavement of the Mirador Mayor's Gardens	Joan Josep Tharrats	1962-1969	The gardens of the Mirador del Alcalde are located on the mountain of Montjuïc. They were created between 1962 and 1969 with a garden project by Joaquim Casamor with a monumental fountain designed by Carles Buïgas. They include a pavement designed by Joan Josep Tharrats, formed by materials such as pebbles, cobblestones, bricks, tiles, pieces of bottle or pieces of iron or concrete. The design is reminiscent of a collage, vaguely reminiscent of Gaudí, with shapes where the circle predominates and colors of dark brown and beige, preferably.	
Pavimento Miró	Joan Miró	1976	In 1968 Joan Miró was commissioned to create a mural for Barcelona Airport, to which he wanted to add two other works to welcome visitors to the city by land, sea and air. Thus, if the airport mural corresponded to the air, for the land he created the sculpture Dona i Ocell, and for the sea this pavement, located in the Plaça de la Boqueria, on La Rambla, near the sea. It is a pavement of terrazzo tiles made with a mixture of white cement stained with crushed colored glass. With a diameter of about 8 m, it has the shape of an irregular circle, and is made in white, black, blue, red and yellow colors. It represents a toponymic landmark, hence the shape of a closed circle, inside which an arrow and several circles can be seen.	
Plaça dels Països Catalans	Helio Piñón and Albert Viaplana	1981-1983	Paradigm of the so-called "hard squares", this square located in front of Sants Station stands out for its minimalist design, with a tendency towards dematerialization and conceptualism. The whole was resolved with a pink granite pavement on which are placed a series of metallic elements of more sculptural than architectural design, such as pergolas, fountains, benches and a clock. It was awarded the FAD prize in 1983.	
Industrial Spain Park	Luis Peña Ganchegui	1985	It was built on land vacated by La España Industrial, a former textile factory founded in 1847 and moved to Mollet del Vallès in 1972. Along the Passeig de Sant Antoni, the park is bordered by tall lighting towers that look like lighthouses, from which steps lead to an artificial lake that can be crossed by boat. The park also has a sports center, ping-pong tables and a children's playground. In the year of its construction it received the FAD Architecture and Interior Design Award.	
Barcelona Metropolitan Corporation sources	Xavier Corberó	1985	In 1985 a set of fountains of the Metropolitan Corporation of Barcelona, designed by Xavier Corberó, were inaugurated. Although 38 fountains were planned, only five were built, due to the disappearance of the Corporation in 1987: they were located in Ciudadella Park, Passeig de Colom, España Industrial Park, Torrent de l'Olla Street and Santa Rosalía Street. Made of bronze, they were two meters high and shaped like a column, of minimalist design, with a circle at the base with a poem by Joan Maragall. The water came from the top of the column and ran down its edges, a fact that favored their oxidation, which is why they were removed between 2010 and 2012.	
Montjuïc Olympic Ring	Carles Buxadé, Joan Margarit, Federico Correa and Alfons Milà	1985-1992	For the 1992 Olympic Games, part of the Montjuïc mountain was remodeled, where the so-called Olympic Ring was located, a large area between the Lluís Companys Olympic Stadium and the Plaça d'Europa, with buildings such as the Palau Sant Jordi, the Bernat Picornell Swimming Pools, the Montjuic Telecommunications Tower and the National Institute of Physical Education. A wide avenue (Passeig de Minici Natal) was formed by several terraces to overcome the unevenness of the terrain, populated by several paved esplanades, staircases, waterfalls and water channels, flower boxes and tall lighting columns located on two symmetrical axes on each side of the promenade.	
Villa Cecilia Gardens	José Antonio Martínez Lapeña and Elías Torres	1986	The gardens of Villa Cecilia are located in the district of Sarrià-Sant Gervasi. They are postmodern in style, with a somewhat labyrinthine structure, which seeks to enhance the various small squares that punctuate the grounds. The street furniture includes benches resembling large, brightly colored scooters, and street light in tree-like shapes. The paths and steps are delimited by white borders, and the site also contains a playground, a skating rink, children's areas and petanque courts. The design of the gardens was awarded the FAD Awards in 1986.	
North Station Park	Beverly Pepper	1988	Parc de l'Estació del Nord is located on the grounds adjacent to the bus station of the same name, and was created in 1988 with a project by Andreu Arriola, Carme Fiol and Enric Pericas. The American sculptor Beverly Pepper designed the park's lighting elements, four-meter-high iron monoliths with spikelike corkscrews at the top, as well as the benches, made of artificial stone that look like chess pieces.	
Paseo de Gracia Station	Daniel Navas and Neus Solé	1991	The 1992 Olympic Games led to the remodeling of the France and Passeig de Gràcia stations. The latter involved the arrangement of lobbies and their connection with the exterior through stairways and elements linking them to the interior architecture: granite and stainless steel walls with the pavement and furniture of Paseo de Gracia. The compositional pieces acquired a sculptural formalization, where a wedge of intense black granite emerged from the subsoil accompanying the descent and ascent of circulations. The stainless steel elements of railings and lighting curved accompanying the pedestrian in a suggestively deconstructivist language. These pieces characterized the urban access to this railway infrastructure for a quarter of a century, until the new section of the exterior road made them disappear (1991-2014).	
Pergolas on Icaria Avenue	Enric Miralles and Carme Pinós	1989-1992	This avenue is located in the heart of the Olympic Village, the residence of the athletes during the 1992 Olympic Games. Along the avenue, a series of pergolas were placed that act more as ornamental than functional elements, made of wooden slats on metal supports. The complex resembles a grove of trees, perhaps replacing the one originally planned, which could not be installed due to the presence of a subway collector.	
Promenade and coastal parks	Martorell-Bohigas-Mackay	1992	For the Olympics, the entire waterfront from Barceloneta to the Forum area was completely remodeled, including a promenade –which has different names depending on the stretch: Puerto Olímpico, Nueva Icaria, Bogatell, Mar Bella and Nova Mar Bella– and a series of new parks, such as Las Cascadas, Puerto Olímpico and Nueva Icaria parks, designed by the firm MBM Arquitectes; and the Poblenou park, by Manuel Ruisánchez and Xavier Vendrell. The area includes children's areas, ping-pong tables, gym equipment and petanque, basketball, volleyball and skateboard courts, as well as beach elements such as showers and watchtowers. Other street furniture includes the Villa Olimpica model fountains, the Piti, Andrea, Sidney, Vial and Nicol FA-3 street light, the Neobarcino, Lungomare, Sillarga and Sicurta benches, and the Bina waste container.	
Olympic fountains	Juan Bordes	1992	For the 1992 Olympic Games, a series of commemorative fountains were installed in different parts of the city, designed by sculptor Juan Bordes in collaboration with architects Òscar Tusquets and Carlos Díaz. Eight were made, all with an artificial stone pedestal and a bronze figure of a child playing with water: Pelota, on Avinguda del Paral·lel; Lançament, at the Mirador del Palau; Buceo, on Avinguda de Chile; Chip-chap, in Plaça Alfonso Comín –currently disappeared–; Cabriola, on Carrer d'Isadora Duncan –disappeared–; Boga, on Avinguda Litoral; Chapuzón, on the Poblenou Breakwater; and Tanteo, in Plaça de les Glòries Catalanes –removed due to renovation of the square–.	
Nou Barris Central Park and Virrey Amat square	Andreu Arriola and Carme Fiol	1997-2007	The park and the square are located in the district of Nou Barris and, although they are not connected, they were urbanized following the same design. The authors were inspired by Picasso cubist painting Horta de Sant Joan, so they fragmented the space into interconnected sections. The park and square as a whole are highlighted by the presence of water, through various ponds with fountains, as well as lighting panels of steel, wood and plastic, with sculptural forms, some in the shape of a tuning fork, 15 m high, and others in the shape of a palm tree, 7 m high, which also serve as pergolas to provide shade. Other urban elements include fountains model Barcelona and Sarastro, benches model G, street lights Pagode, Nicol, Piti, Kanya and Assembly, waste container BCN Circular and Paperegena, etc. The park was awarded the International Urban Landscape Award in 2007 in Frankfurt (Germany).	
Anne Frank Pavement	Ignasi Sanfeliu	2001	Made in homage to Anne Frank, it is located at the confluence of Seneca and Minerva streets, in the district of Gracia. It is made of granite with strips of corten steel, forming various drawings, to which are added the name and vital dates of the honoree and various Hebrew letters, which take on the character of pictograms.	
Diagonal Mar Park	Enric Miralles and Benedetta Tagliabue	2002	It is located at the end of Diagonal Avenue, near the beach. It is a park of modern design, in which stand out several metal structures similar to tubular filigree of whimsical shapes, as sculptural pieces that punctuate the entire enclosure and that at certain points hold large flower boxes made of colored ceramics, the work of ceramist Antoni Cumella Vendrell. The benches are shaped like sea waves, and are called Lungomare, an Italian word meaning "to walk by the sea". There is also a children's area, gymnastic and musical apparatus, an amphitheater, soccer and basketball fields, petanque courts and ping-pong tables.	
Forum Park and bathing area	Elías Torres, José Antonio Martínez Lapeña, Alejandro Zaera, Beth Galí, Jaume Benavent	2004	It is located on the border between Barcelona and Sant Adrià de Besòs, on the site where the 2004 Universal Forum of Cultures was held. The main space is a large esplanade, the Forum Square, designed by Torres and Lapeña, presided over by a large photovoltaic panel, where there are also folded pergolas called Los pajaritos, as well as Bosque de columnas, for multipurpose use. Other elements by the same authors are the Hebi model benches, with undulating forms, and Lama fountains, in the form of folded sheets. Another set of tree-like pergolas of different colors is located next to the Convention Center. There are also areas for children and gymnastics equipment. The complex includes the so-called Parc del Fòrum, designed by Alejandro Zaera, named after two auditoriums with open-air bleachers designed for concerts and shows; the space between the two is formed by a series of dunes that combine plant spaces with concrete tile pavements in the shape of a crescent moon in reddish and ochre tones. Next to the park is the 2 ha bathing area, designed by Galí and Benavent, a beach without sand that provides access by steps and ramps to the seashore, enclosed by posts to form a safe environment like a swimming pool. This area is protected from the waves by a reef, which in turn forms an artificial island called Pangea. The enclosure includes sun loungers, lockers, changing rooms, showers and other elements and services.	
Gran Vía linear park	Andreu Arriola and Carme Fiol	2007	It is located on a section of the Gran Via de les Corts Catalanes between Plaça de les Glòries Catalanes and Sant Adrià de Besòs. This is a highway with heavy traffic, so the first intervention consisted of installing a series of acoustic screens to dampen the noise. The pedestrian area is divided in two by the highway, so numerous bridges and footbridges were built to connect the two sides of the Gran Vía. The resulting public space was furnished with various elements, such as an elevated water channel with waterfalls falling into various ponds, or a series of benches with different designs: snail, swallow, star, spiral or boomerang.	
Solitary chimney	Elías Torres and José Antonio Martínez Lapeña	2007	Located in Ernest Lluch Square, which served as the entrance to the Universal Forum of Cultures in 2004, it is a 20-meter-high steel column that houses various electronic devices for measuring wind speed and direction, temperature, humidity, atmospheric pressure and solar radiation, the results of which are displayed on digital screens in the shape of a banner at the top of the column. It also includes an analog clock and bars indicating the four cardinal points, and is topped at the top by a lightning rod.	
Poblenou Center Park	Jean Nouvel	2008	Jean Nouvel, who also designed the Torre Agbar skyscraper in Barcelona, designed this park in an avant-garde style, with a series of minimalist elements and an abstract conception. It is divided into various thematic spaces, where urban and sculptural elements coexist in harmony with the vegetation. Among them are the Ramos, a series of vertical elements in the form of sculptural flower boxes, as well as the "sky wells", a series of vertical or cone-shaped luminaires made of steel tubes and metal mesh. Other lighting elements are shaped like a perforated sphere, offering a light similar to that of a discotheque. Also noteworthy is the Pavement, made of concrete tiles with circular pieces of ceramic and stainless steel in red and yellow in homage to the Catalan flag. The street furniture is completed with aluminum swivel chairs, bicycle parking rack, a children's area, petanque courts and ping-pong tables.	
Lesseps Square	Albert Viaplana	2009	The remodeling of Plaça de Lesseps stands out for the artistification of its urban elements. The complex was named The Suez Canal, in honor of the French engineer to whom the square is dedicated, builder of the great canal linking the Mediterranean Sea to the Red Sea. Thus, an elevated metal gutter crosses the entire square, with a flow of water that empties into a waterfall over a pool located in front of the Jaume Fuster Library. This channel is complemented by two bridges that house several flower boxes, as well as two inclined platforms at both ends of the square that resemble the bow and stern of a ship, while lighting towers and a tall metal structure in the shape of a parallelepiped that resembles a baldachin, located in the middle of the square, simulate the cockpit and masts of the ship. There is also an amphitheater, children's areas and petanque courts.	
Can Rigal Park		2012	Can Rigal Park is located in the Les Corts district and was inaugurated in 2012 with a project developed by the Barcelona metropolitan area. It is a park of modern design where some large solar panels stand out, which at the same time that produce energy serve as aesthetic elements of the set, as they have an almost sculptural appearance. The complex includes a bar, a dog area and a circuit of fitness equipment for the elderly.	
Les Rieres d'Horta Park		2013	This park is located in the Horta-Guinardó district. It is a linear park, which runs along the entire length of the Statute of Catalonia Avenue, from the Statute Square to Botticelli Square. It is located over a cleaning park and rainwater tank, which is buried under the street. It has been designed with the highest sustainability criteria, as can be seen in the energy produced by photovoltaic pergolas that supply the lighting network, which uses LED technology. These pergolas are located over a series of petanque courts, to which they provide shade. There is also a gymnastics circuit with equipment designed especially for the elderly, a children's play area, and a squarespace with a stage for popular celebrations.	

== Gallery ==
Pavement

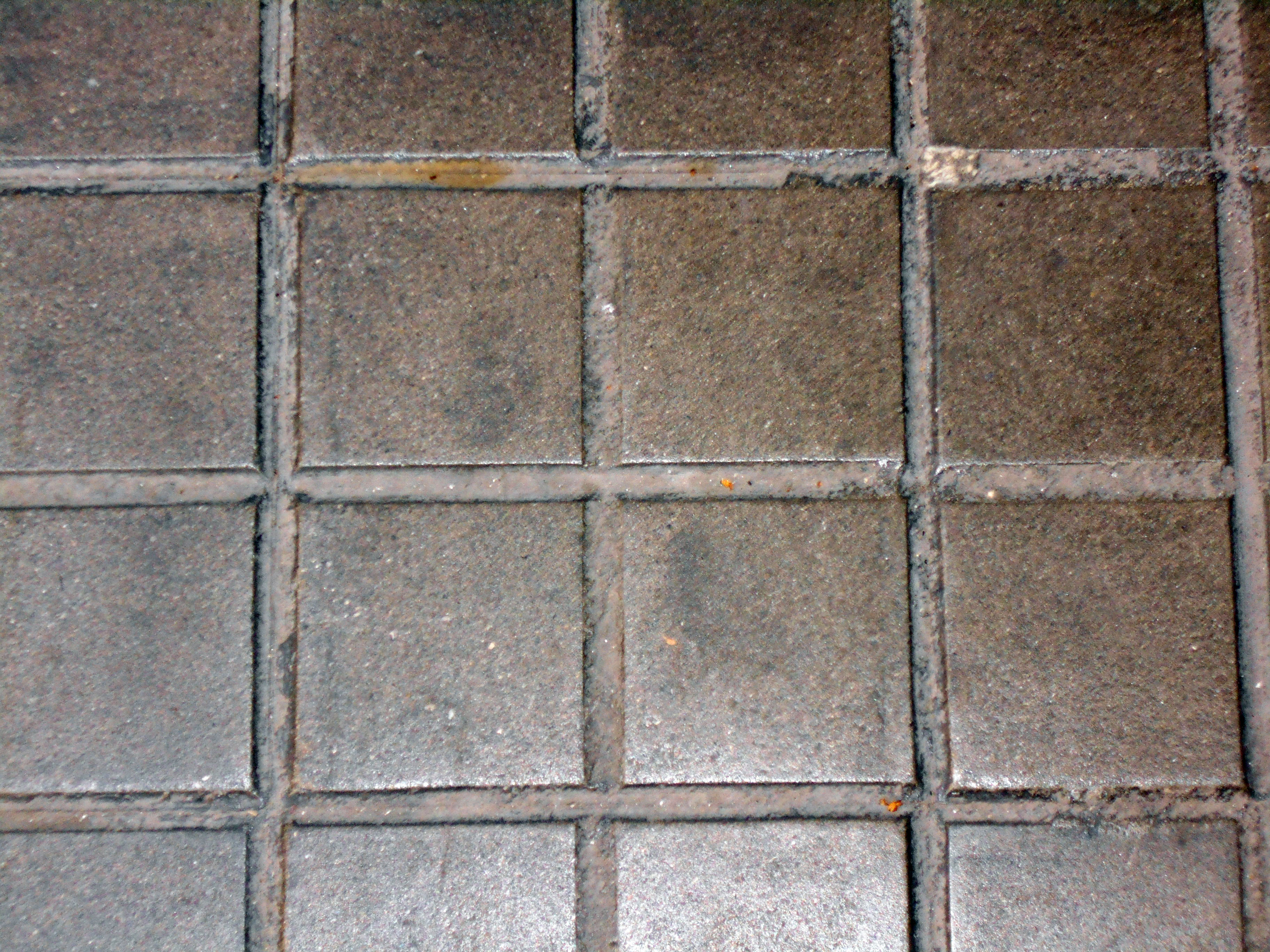
4 tablets tile.

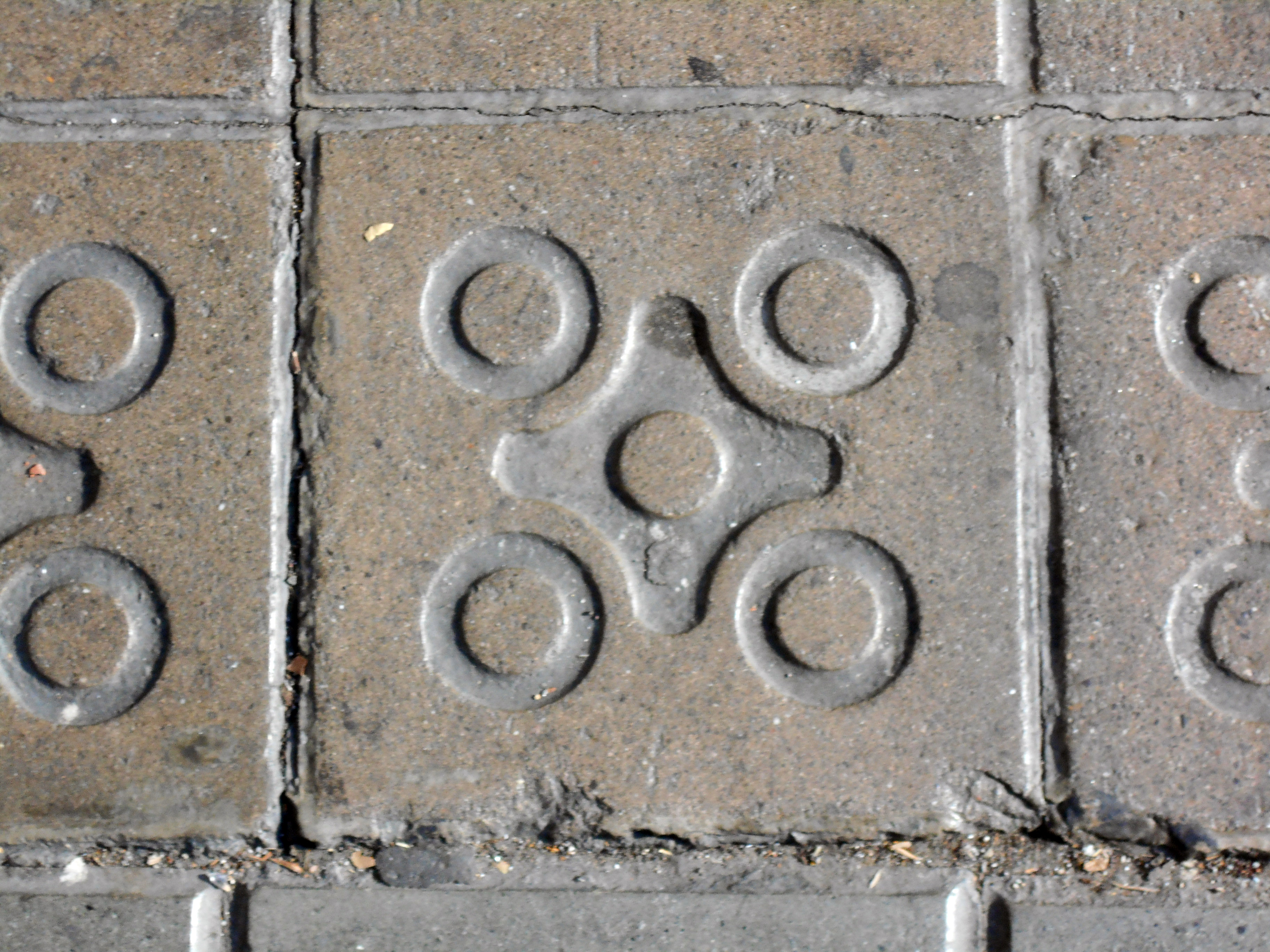
Rhombus tile.

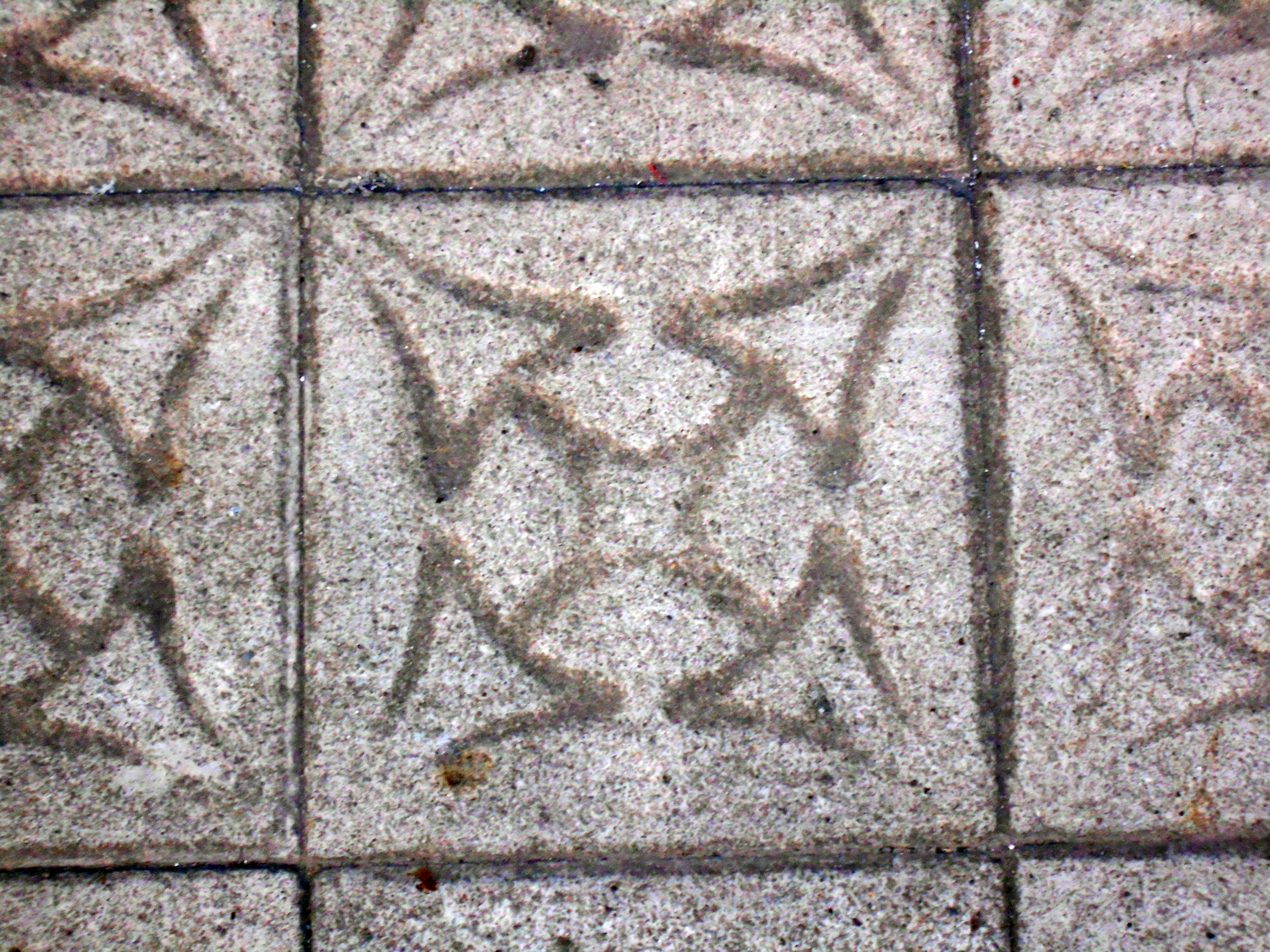
Roses tile.

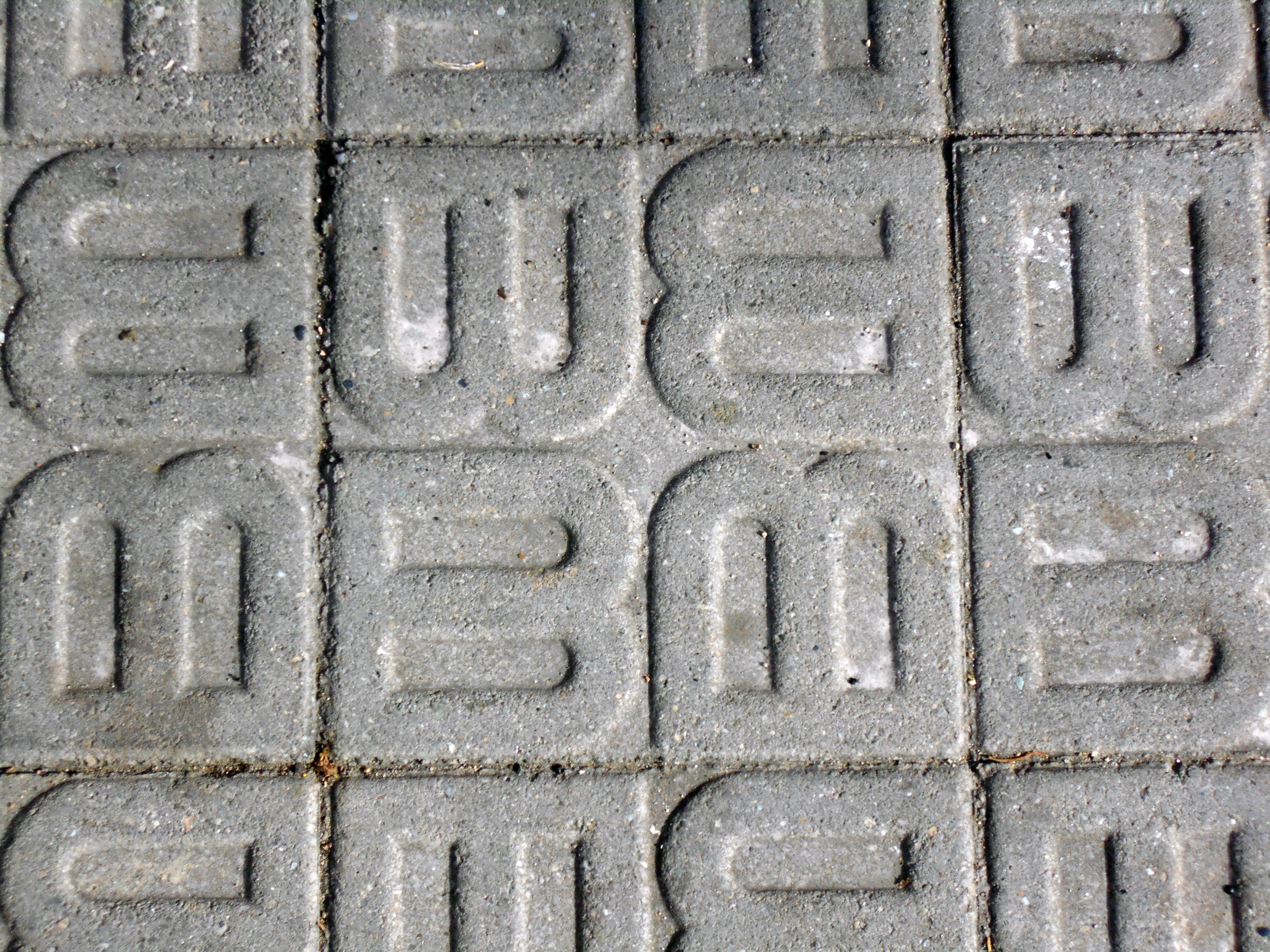
B tile (from Barcelona).

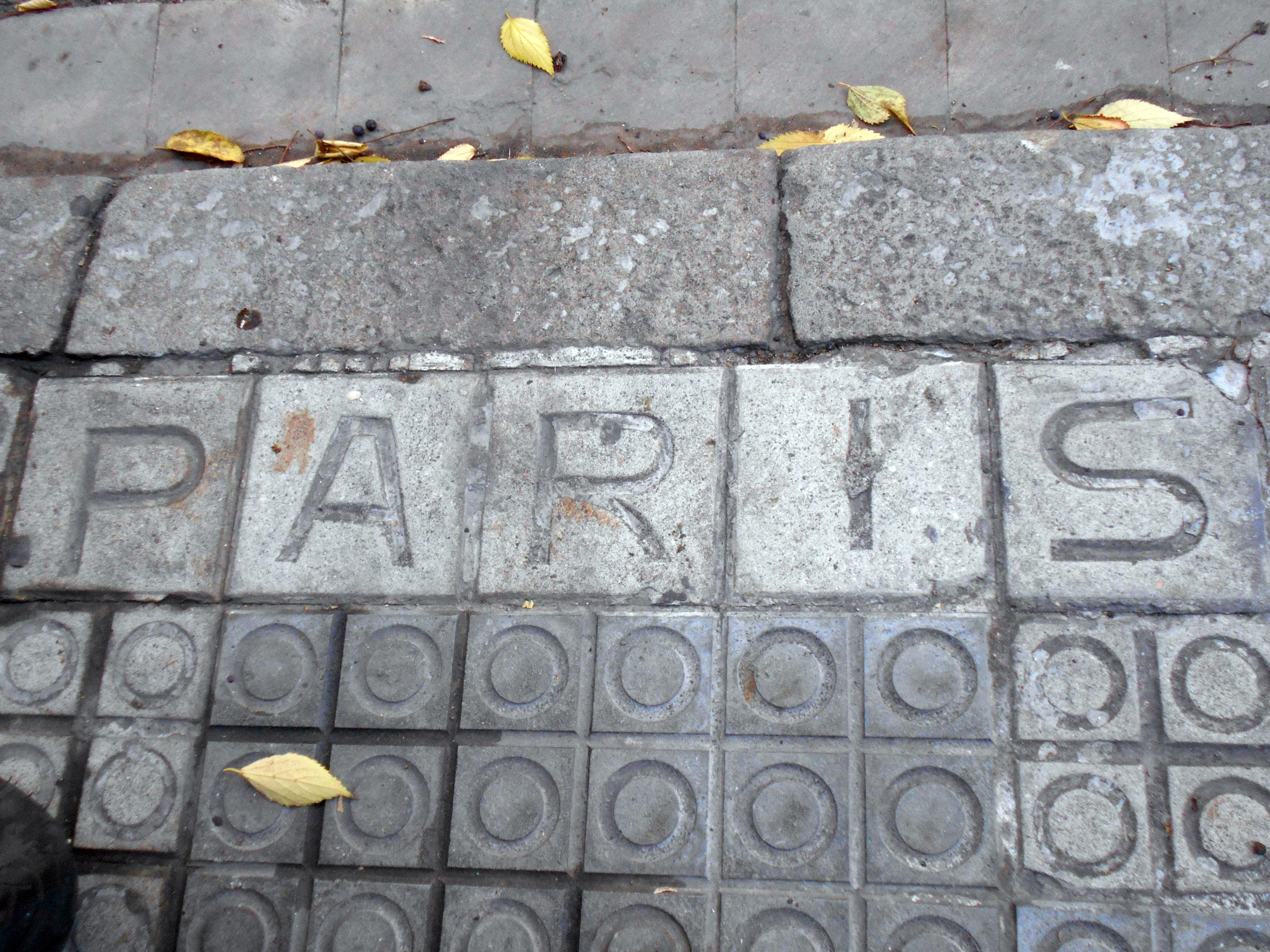
Letter tiles, Paris street.

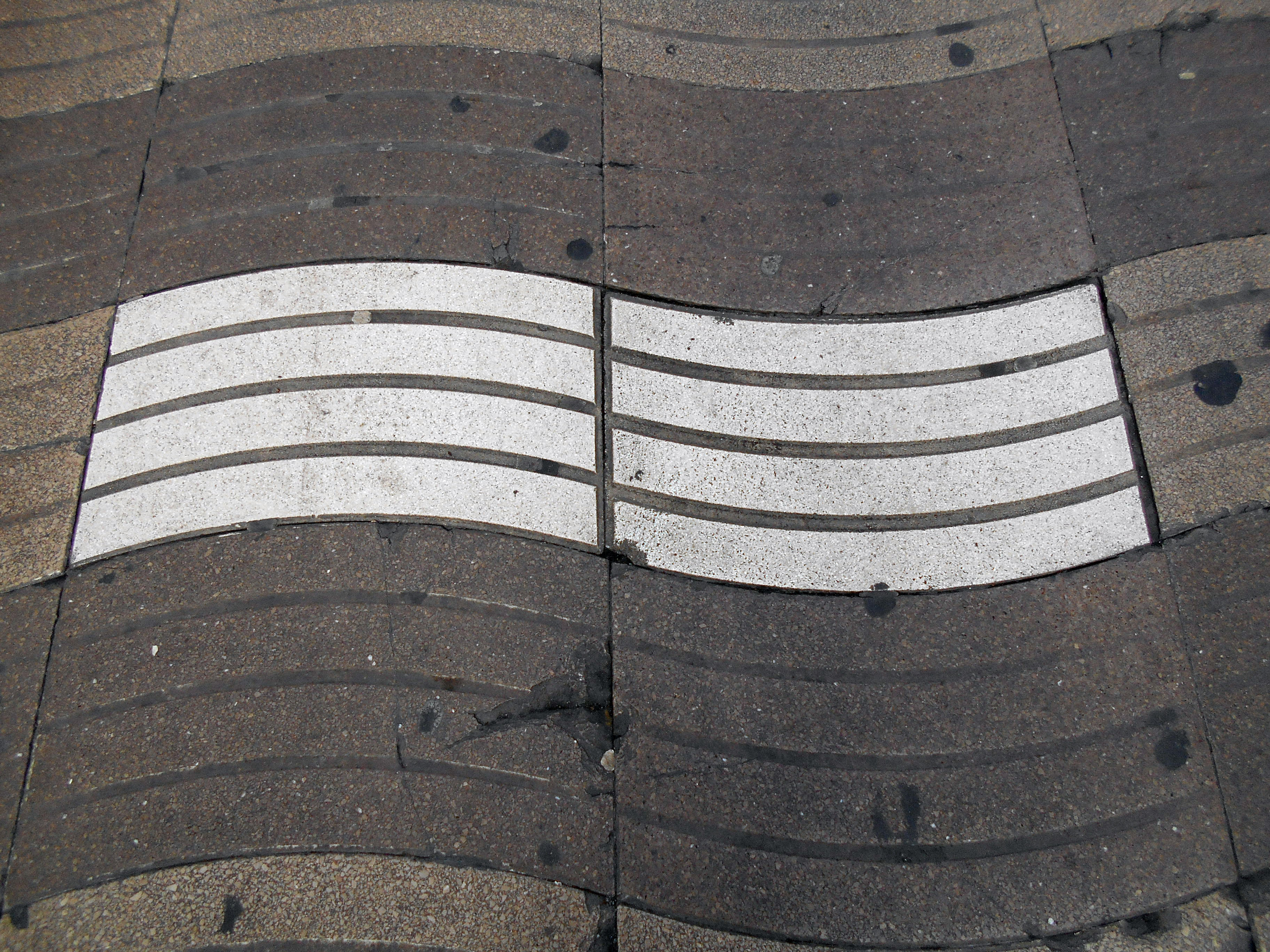
Pavement of La Rambla.
Fountains

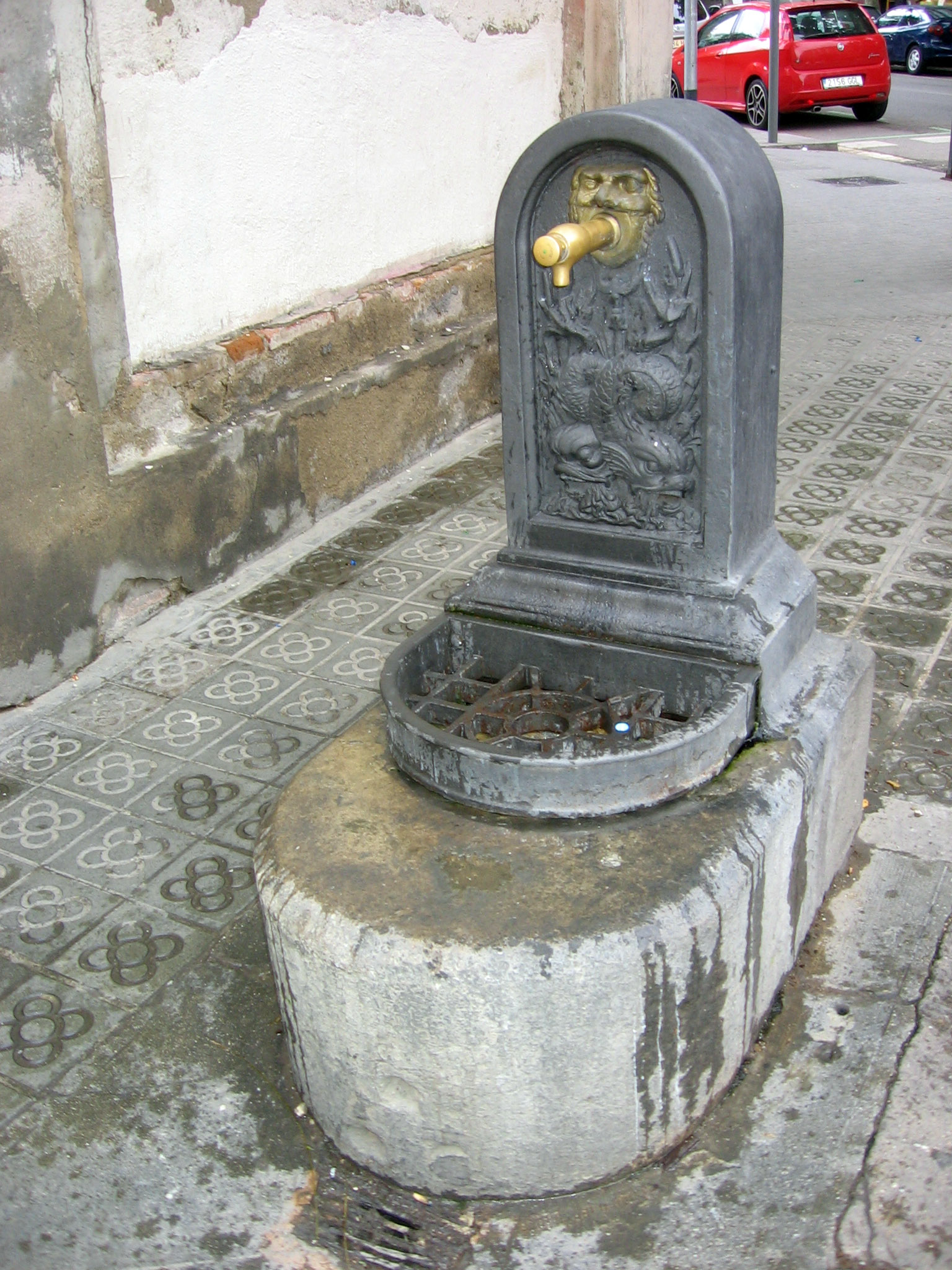
Chapel Model.

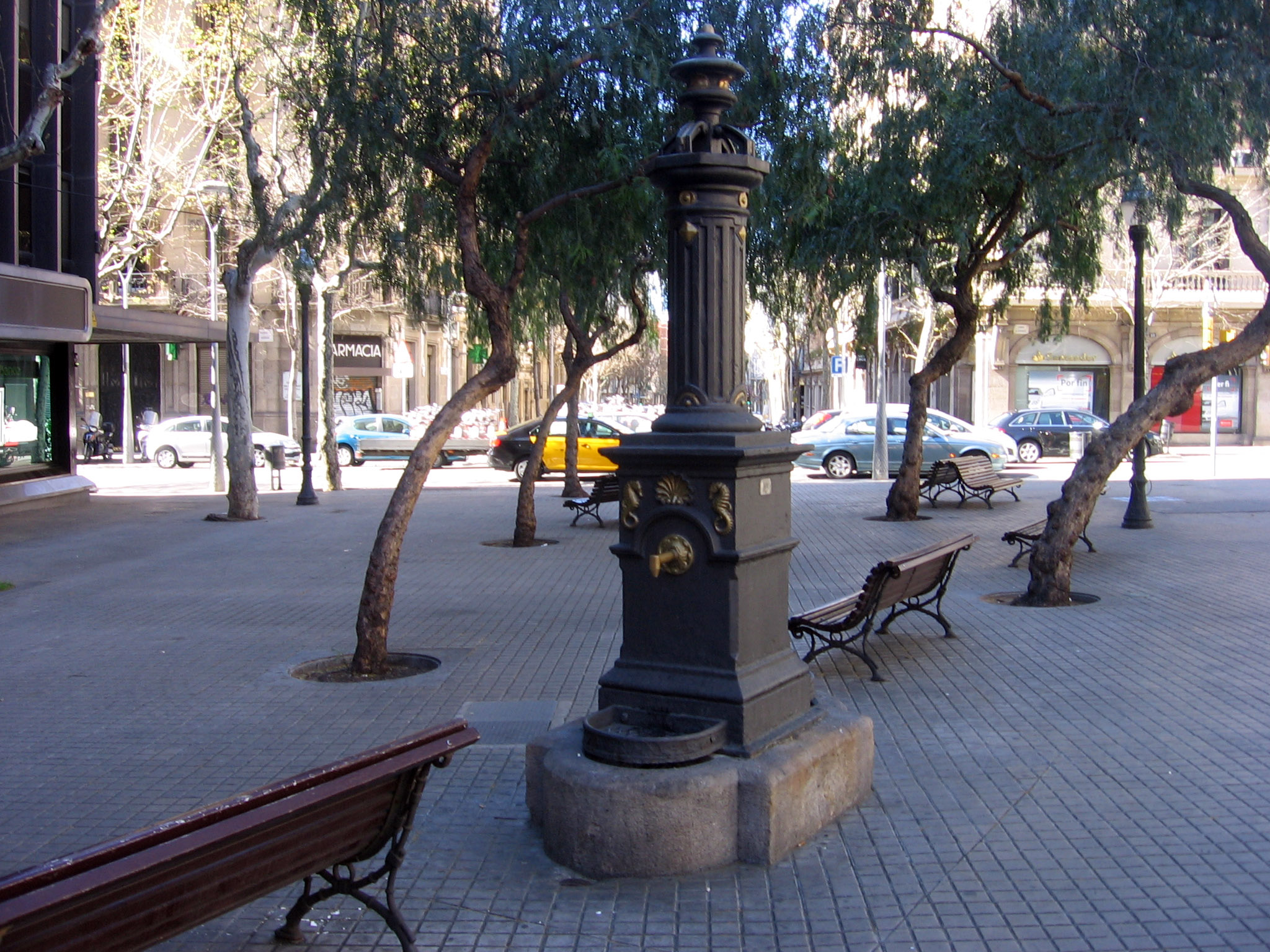
Fountain designed by Antoni Rovira i Trias.

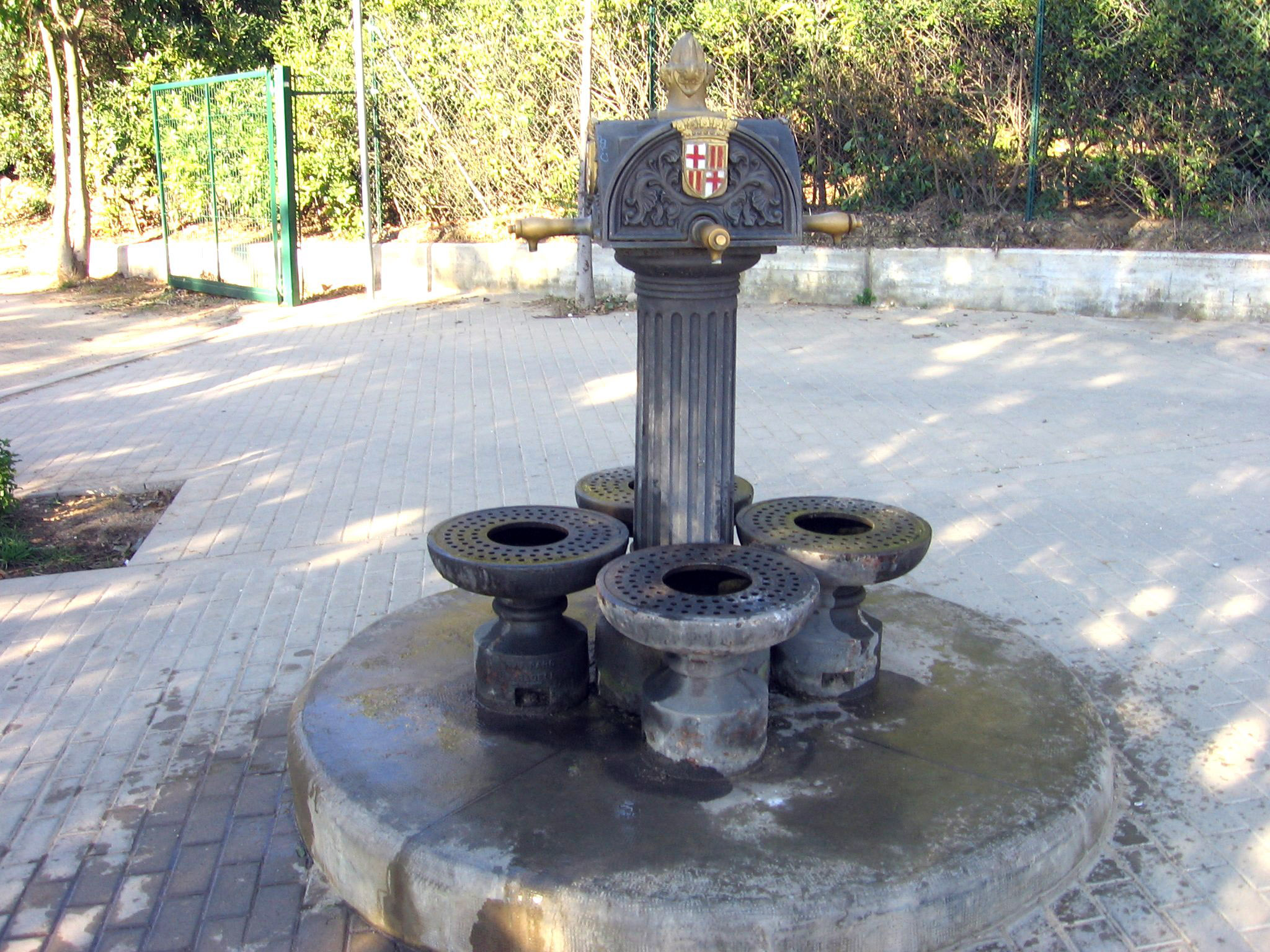
Badalona model.

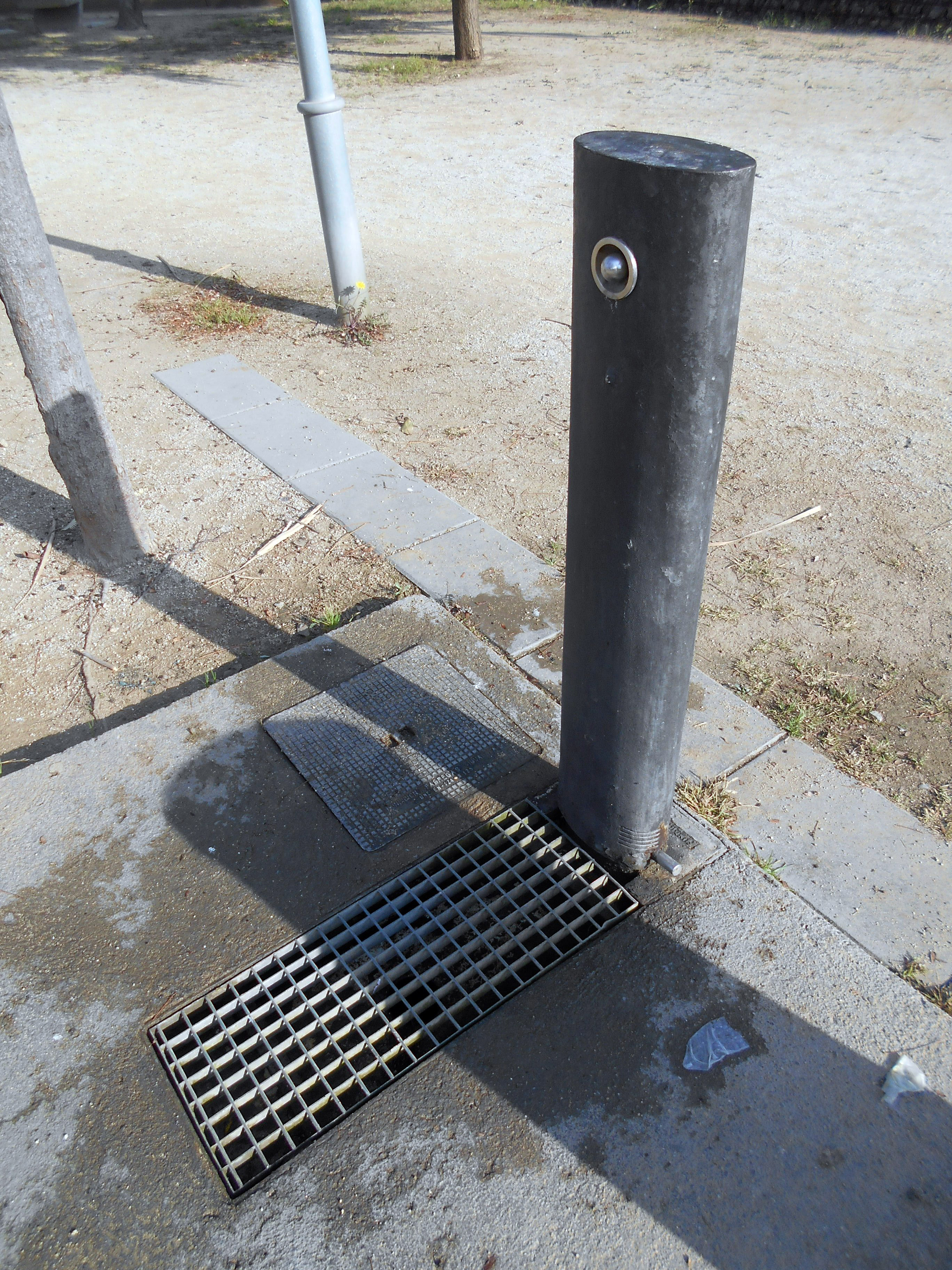
Georgina model.

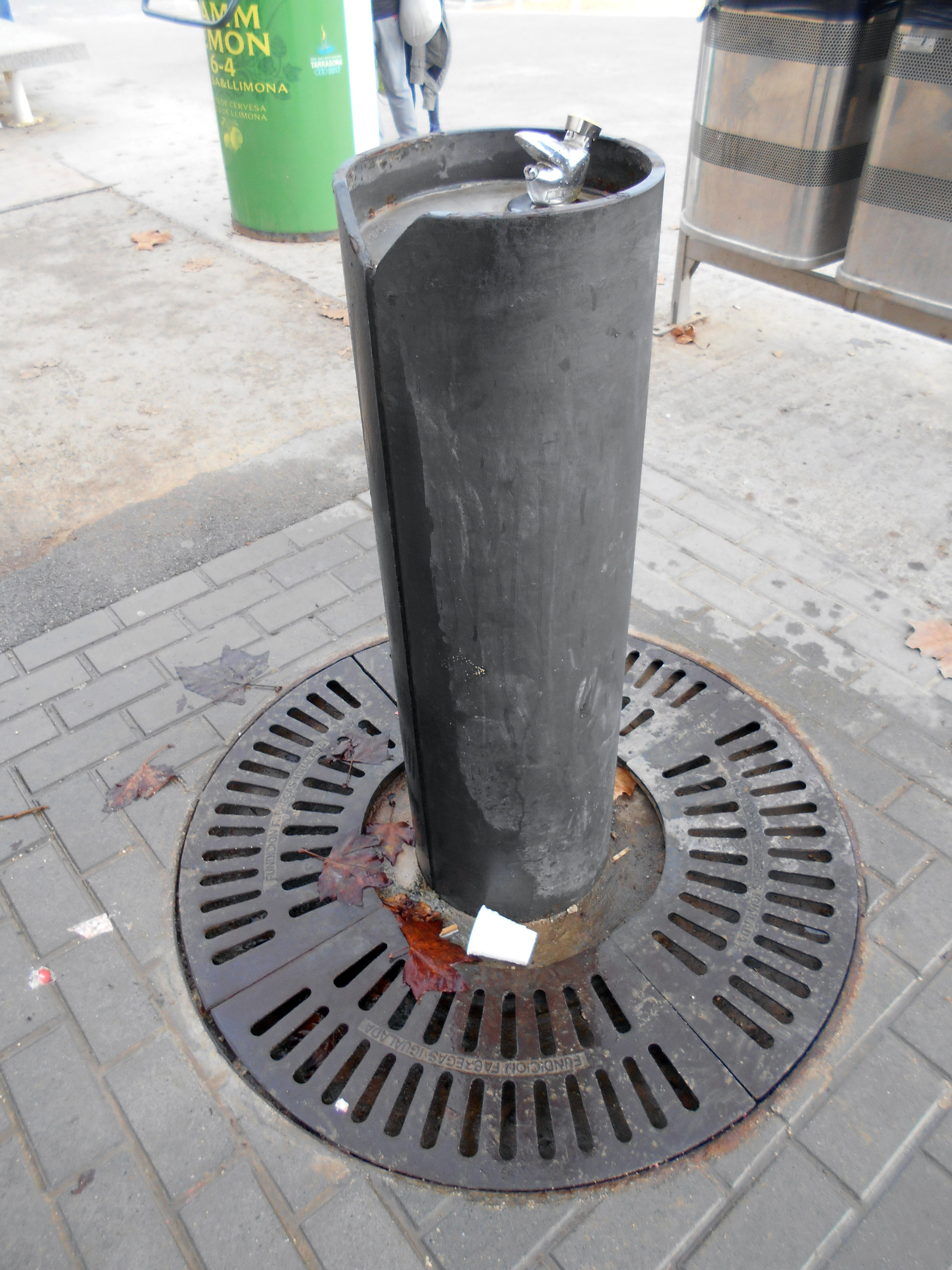
Olympic Village model.

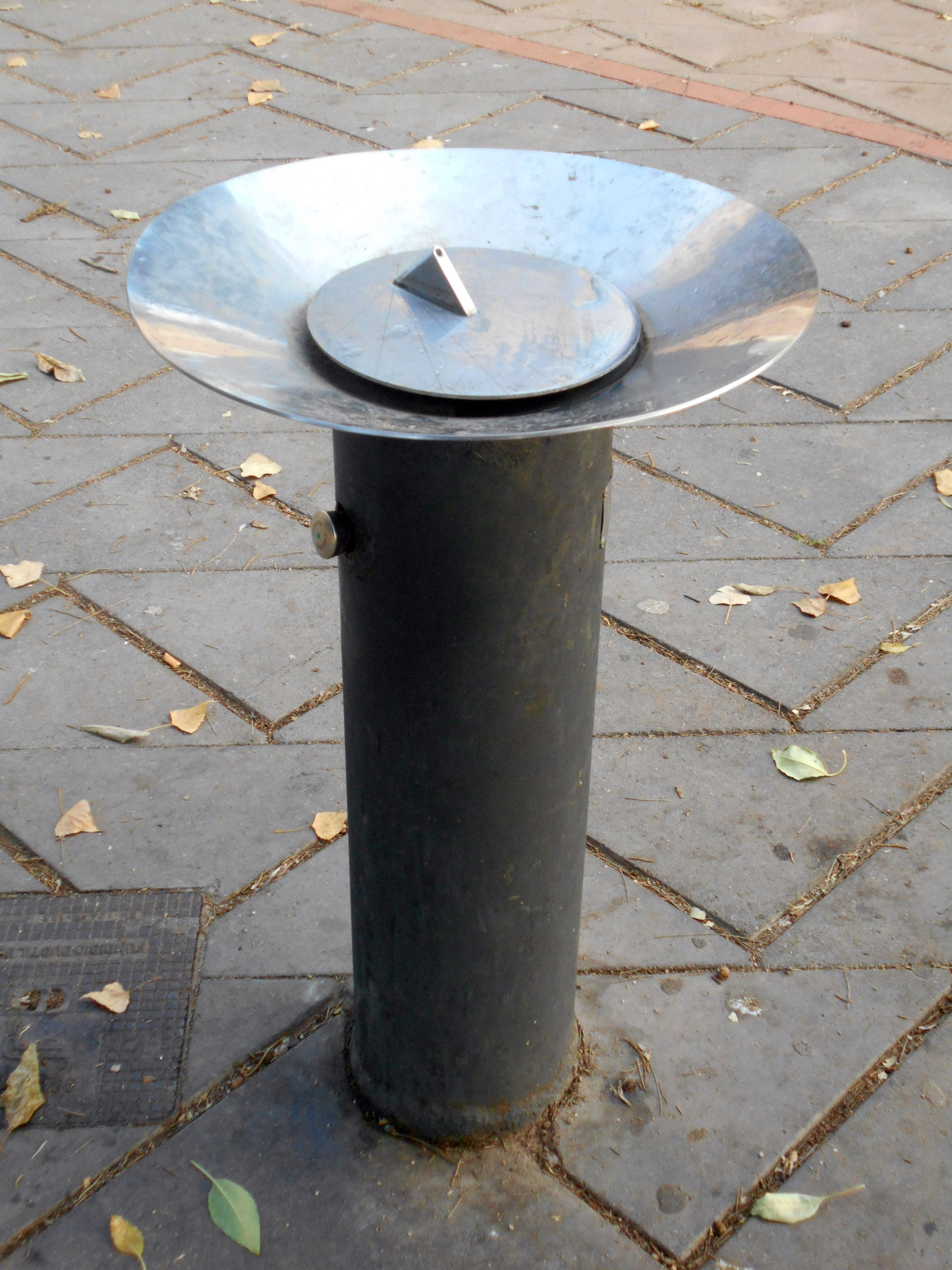
Sarastro model.

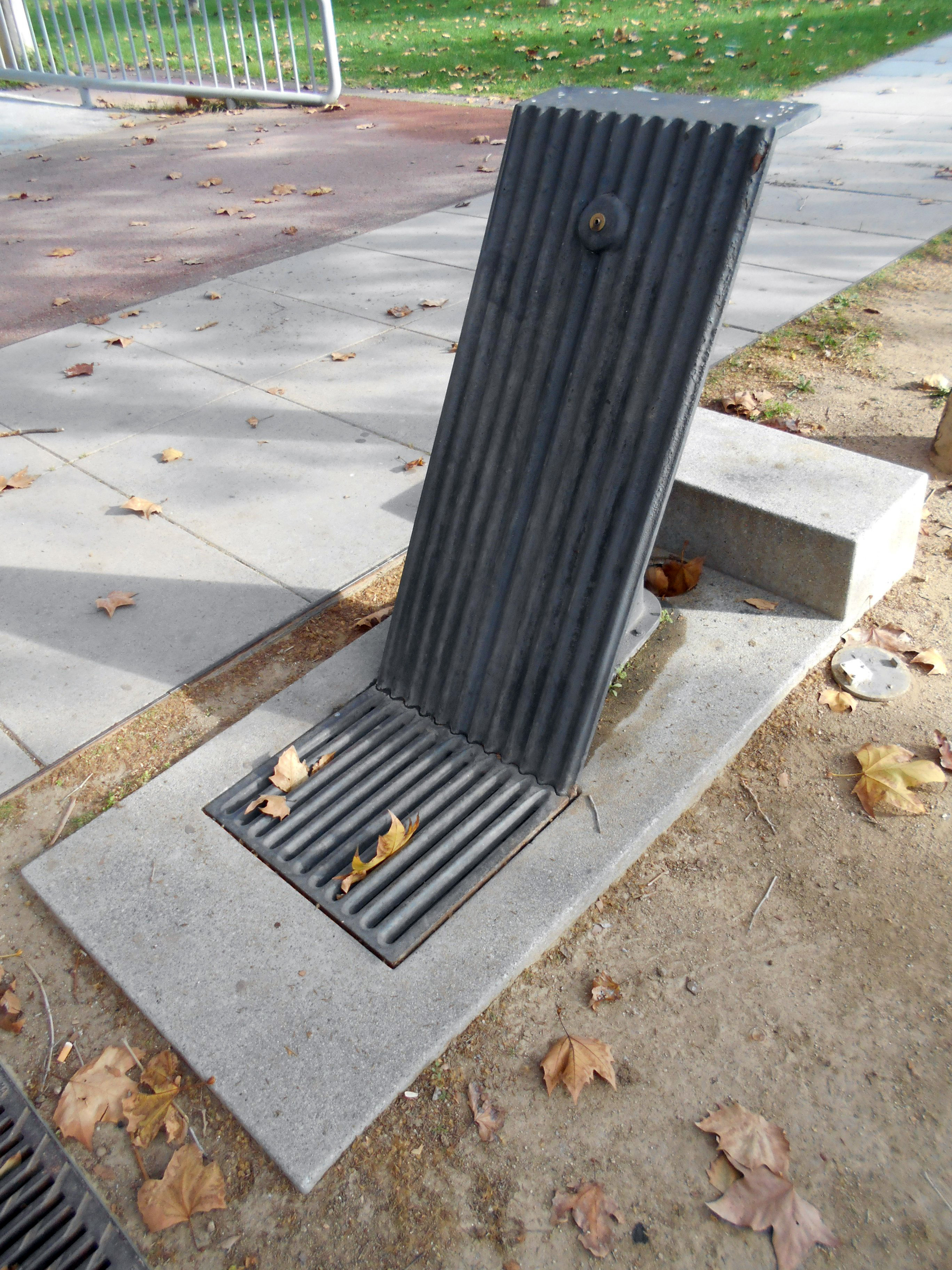
Lama Model.

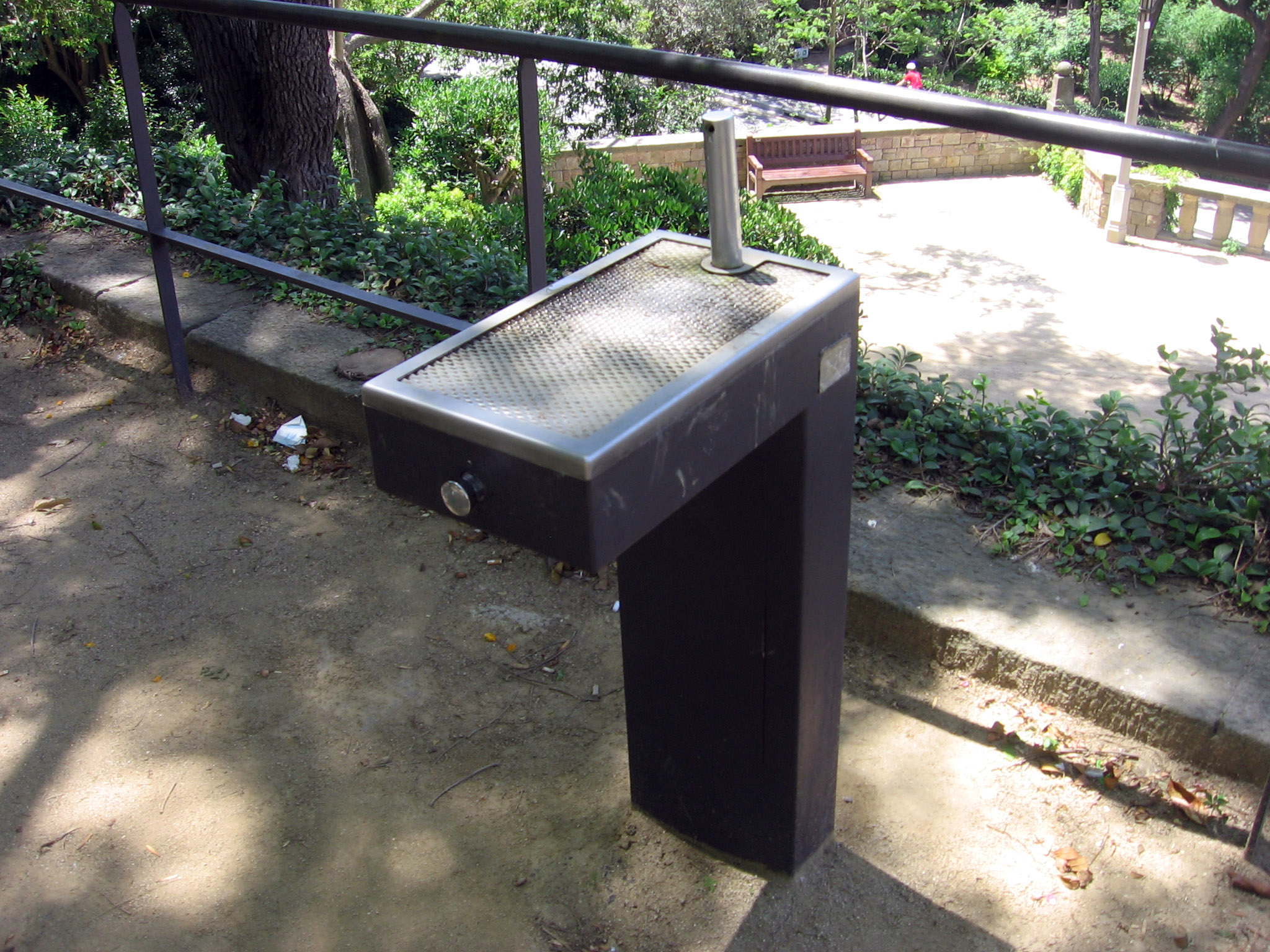
Flow Model.
Bench

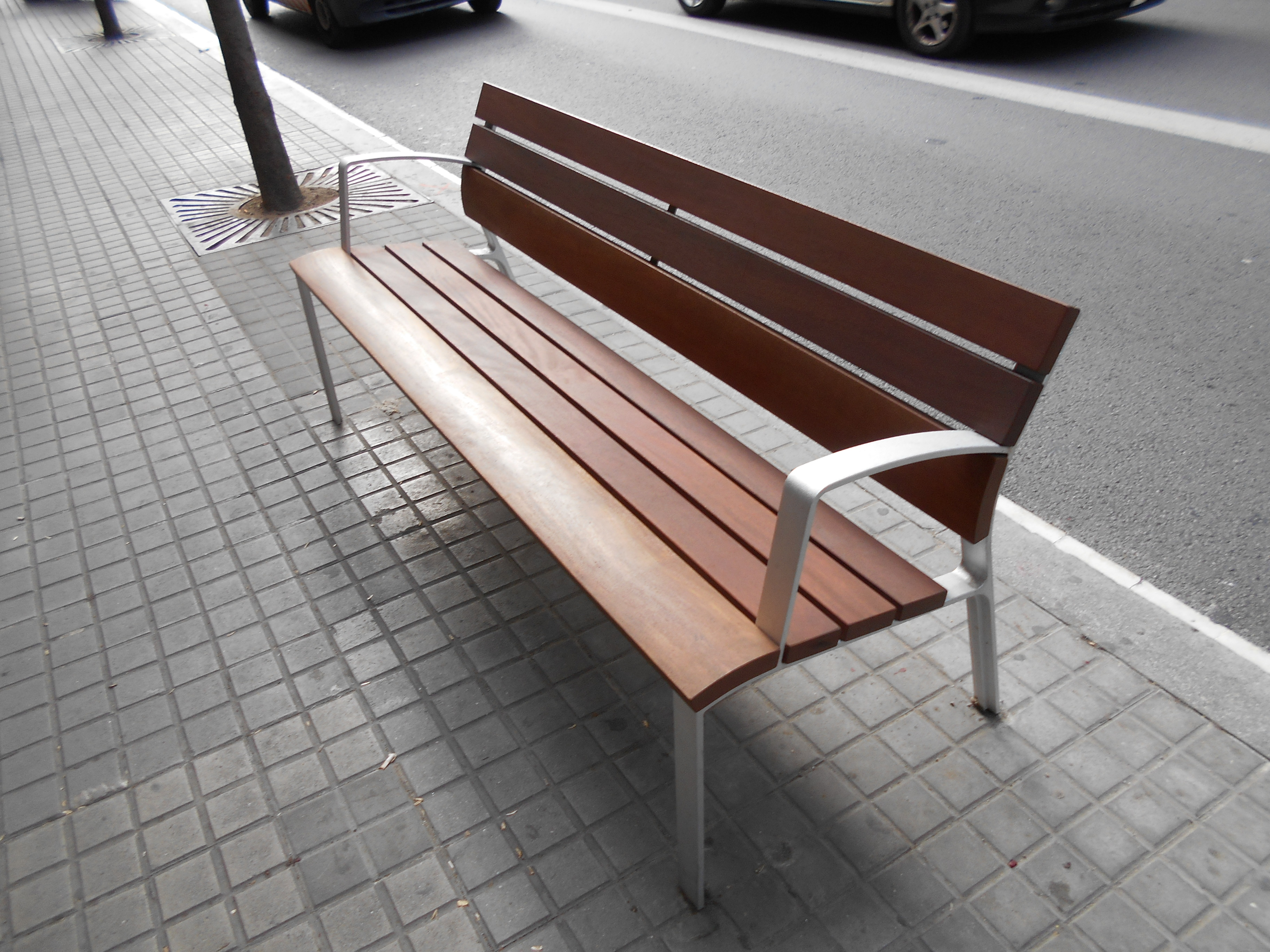
Light Neo-Romantic model.

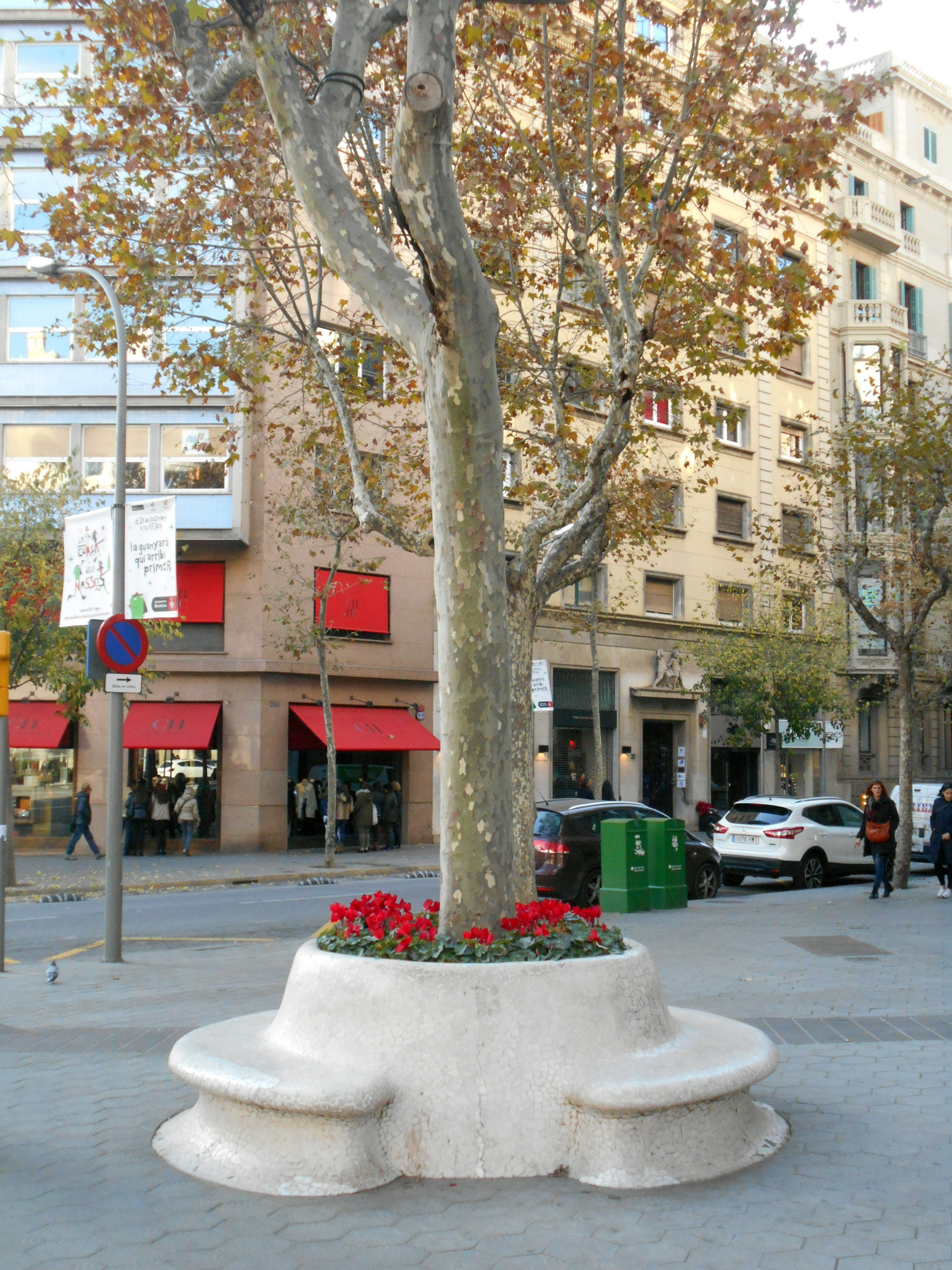
Planter-bench in Paseo de Gracia.

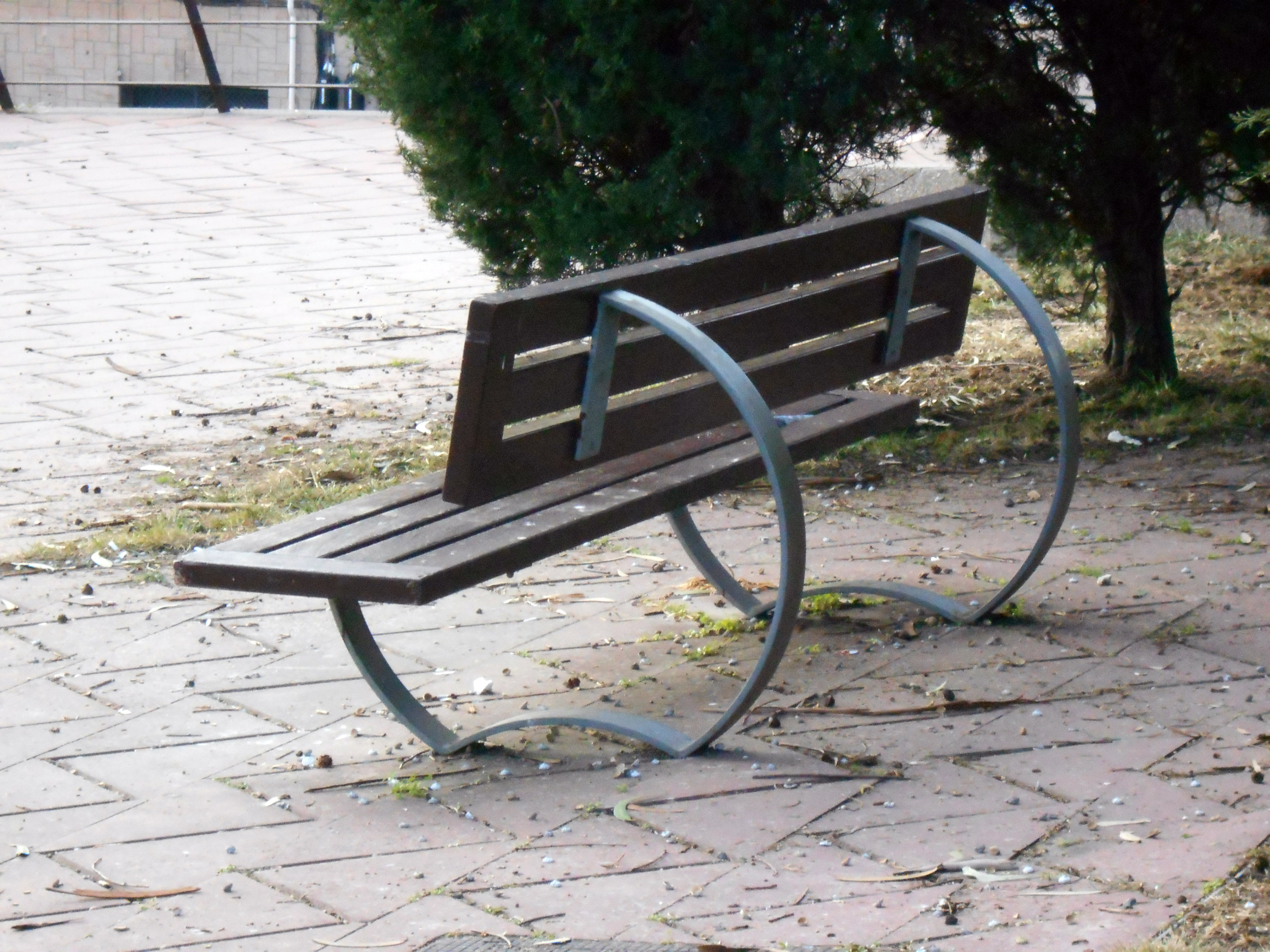
G Model.

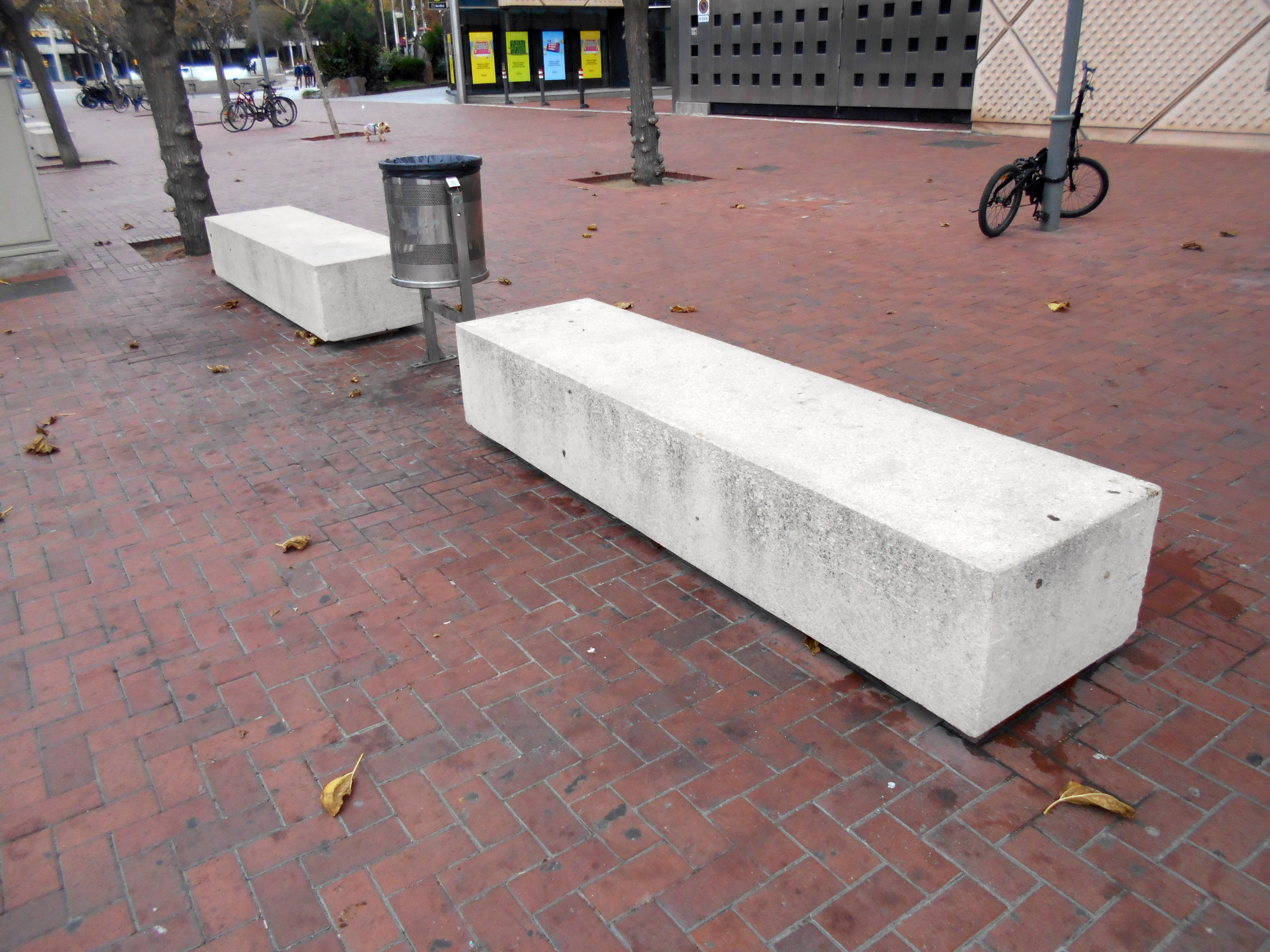
Socrates model.

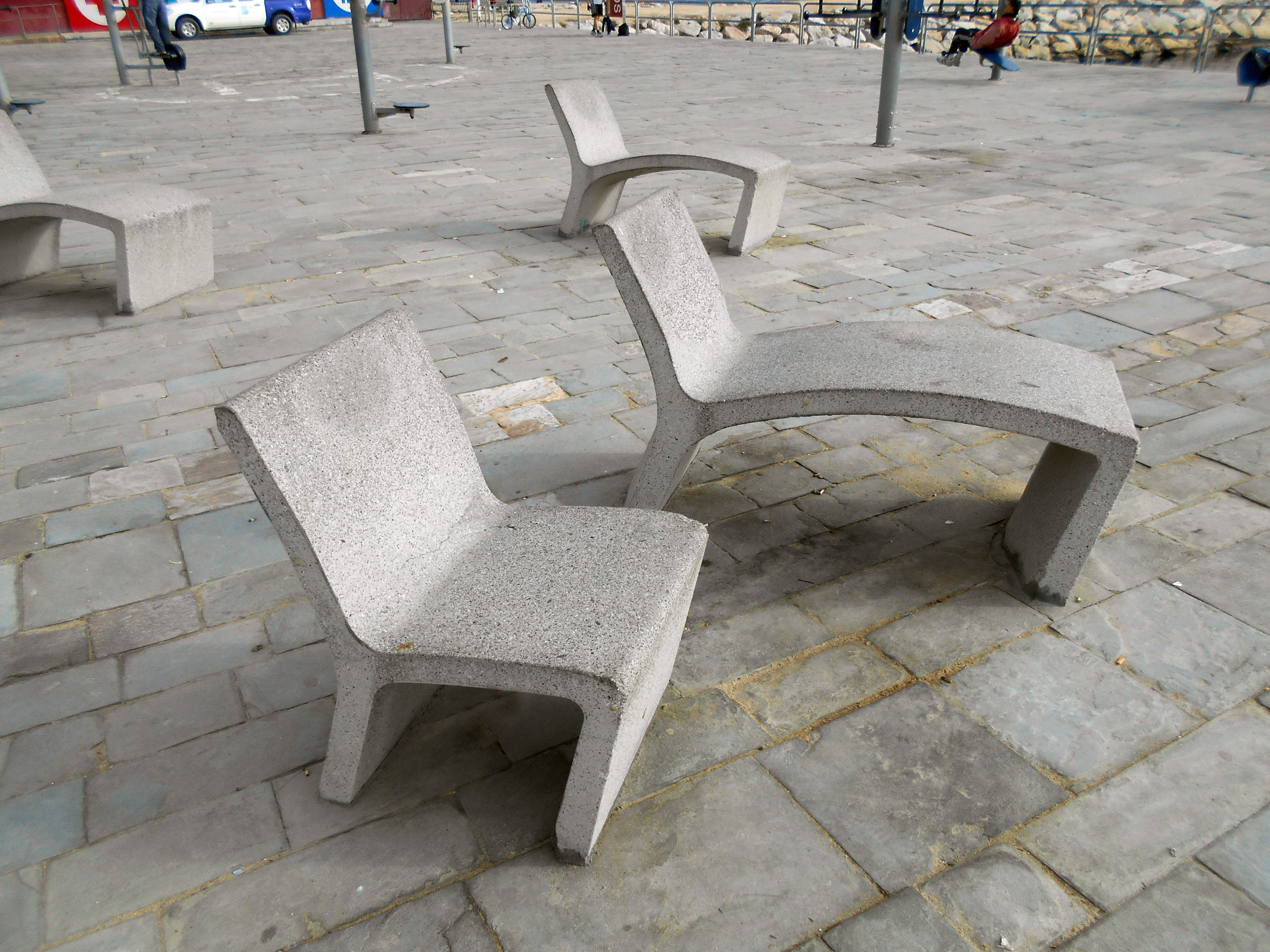
Sillarga and Sicurta models.

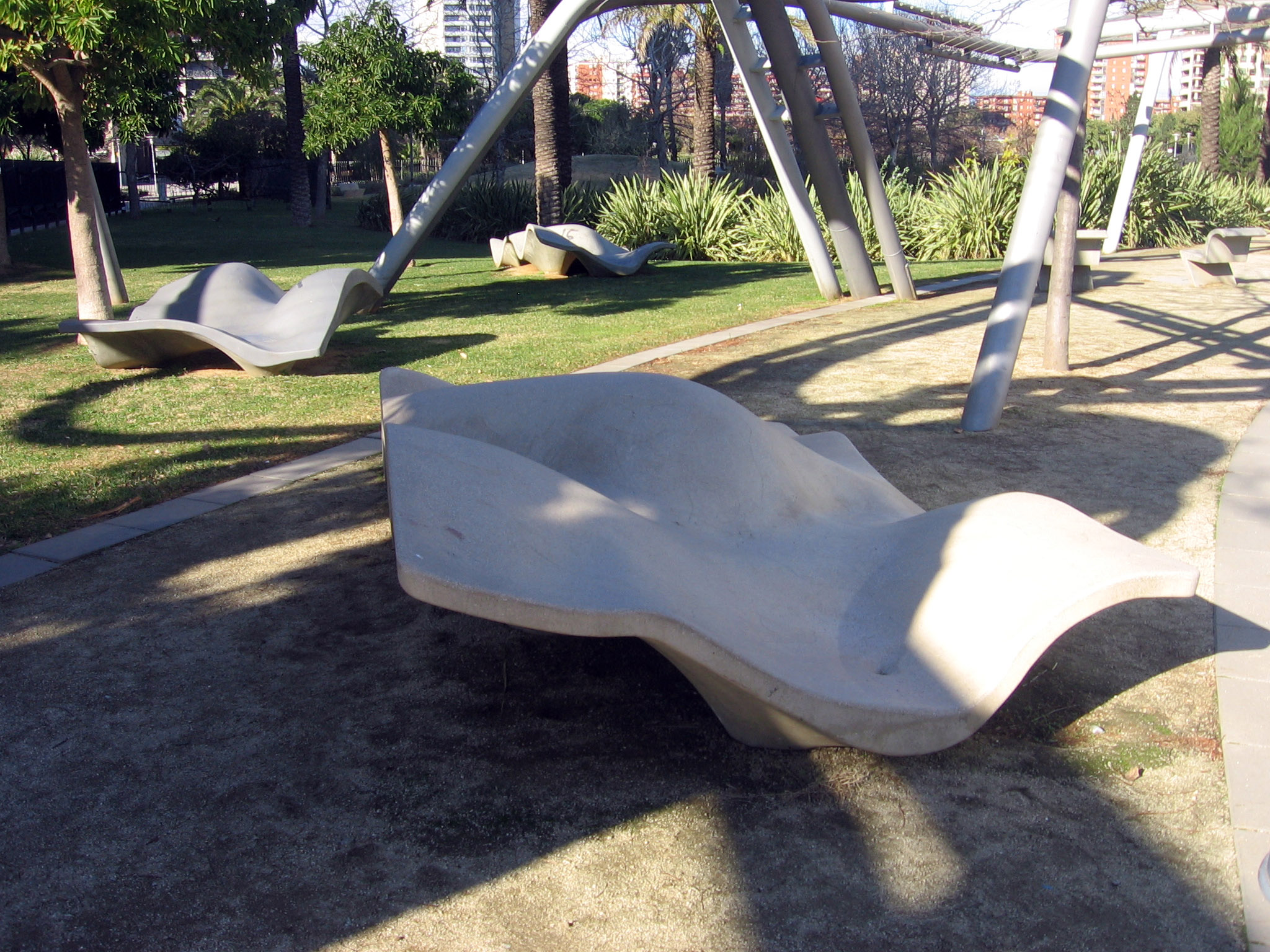
Lungomare model.

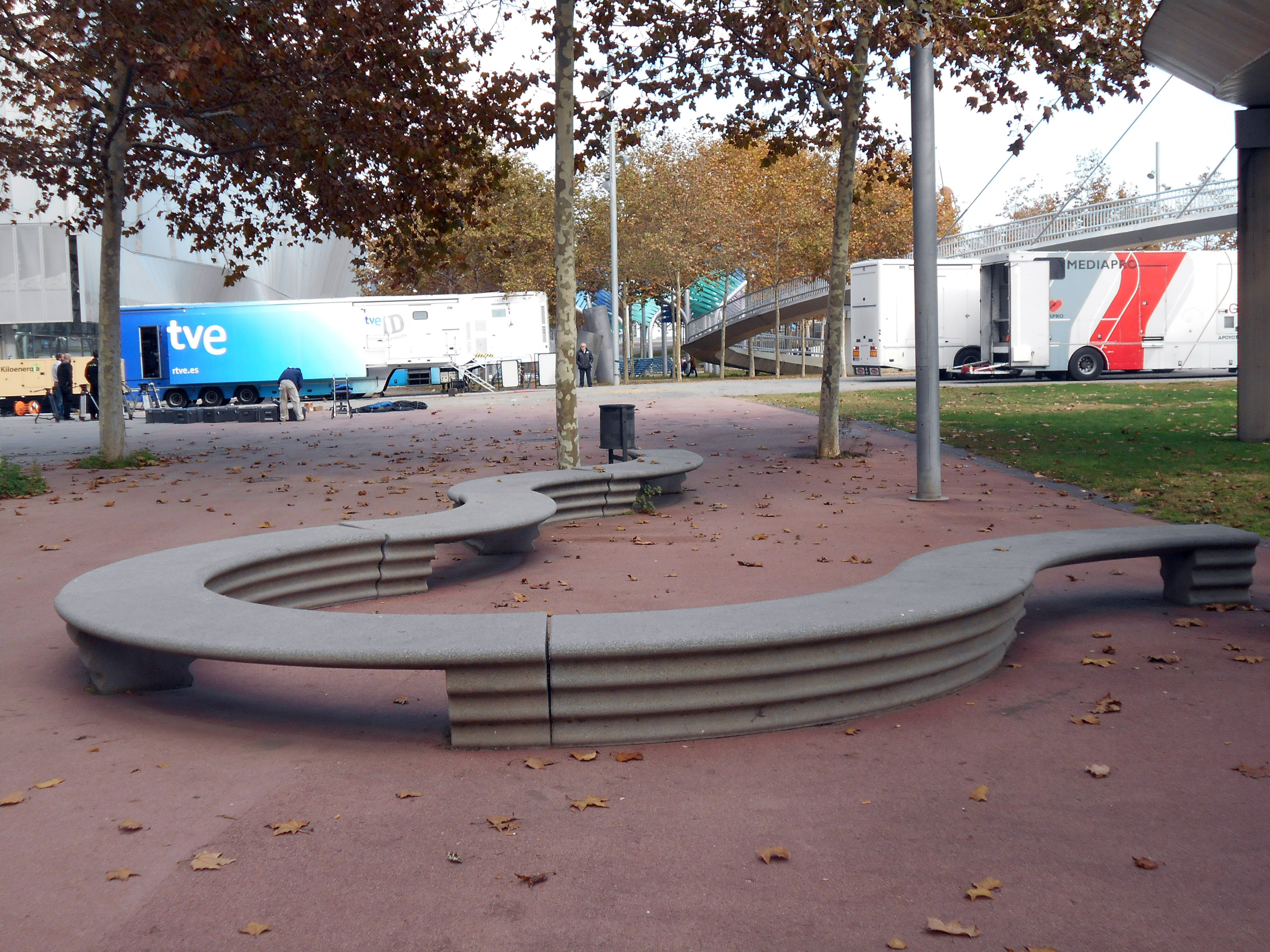
Hebi model.
Street light

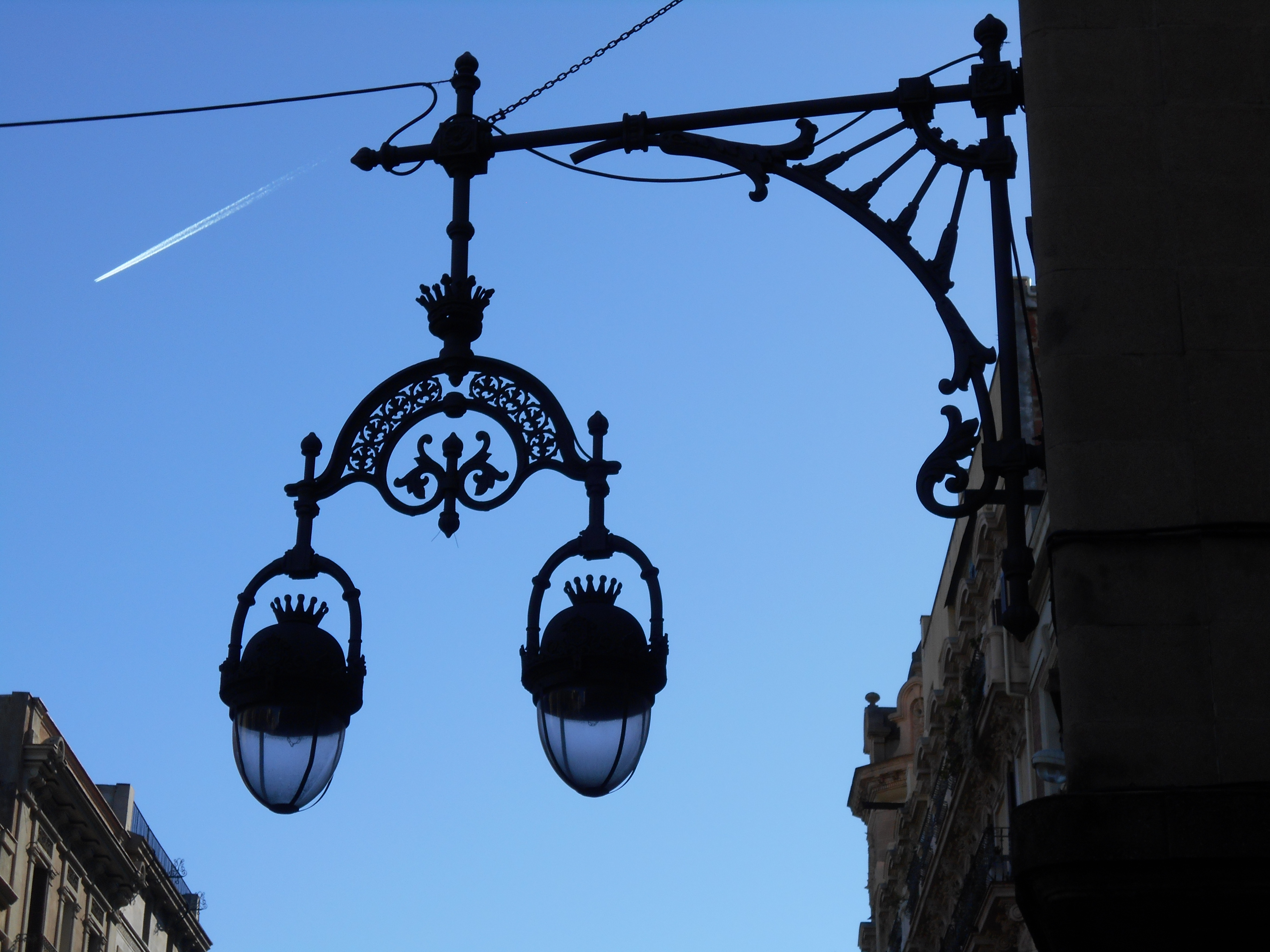
Mural lantern of the Main Street of Gracia.

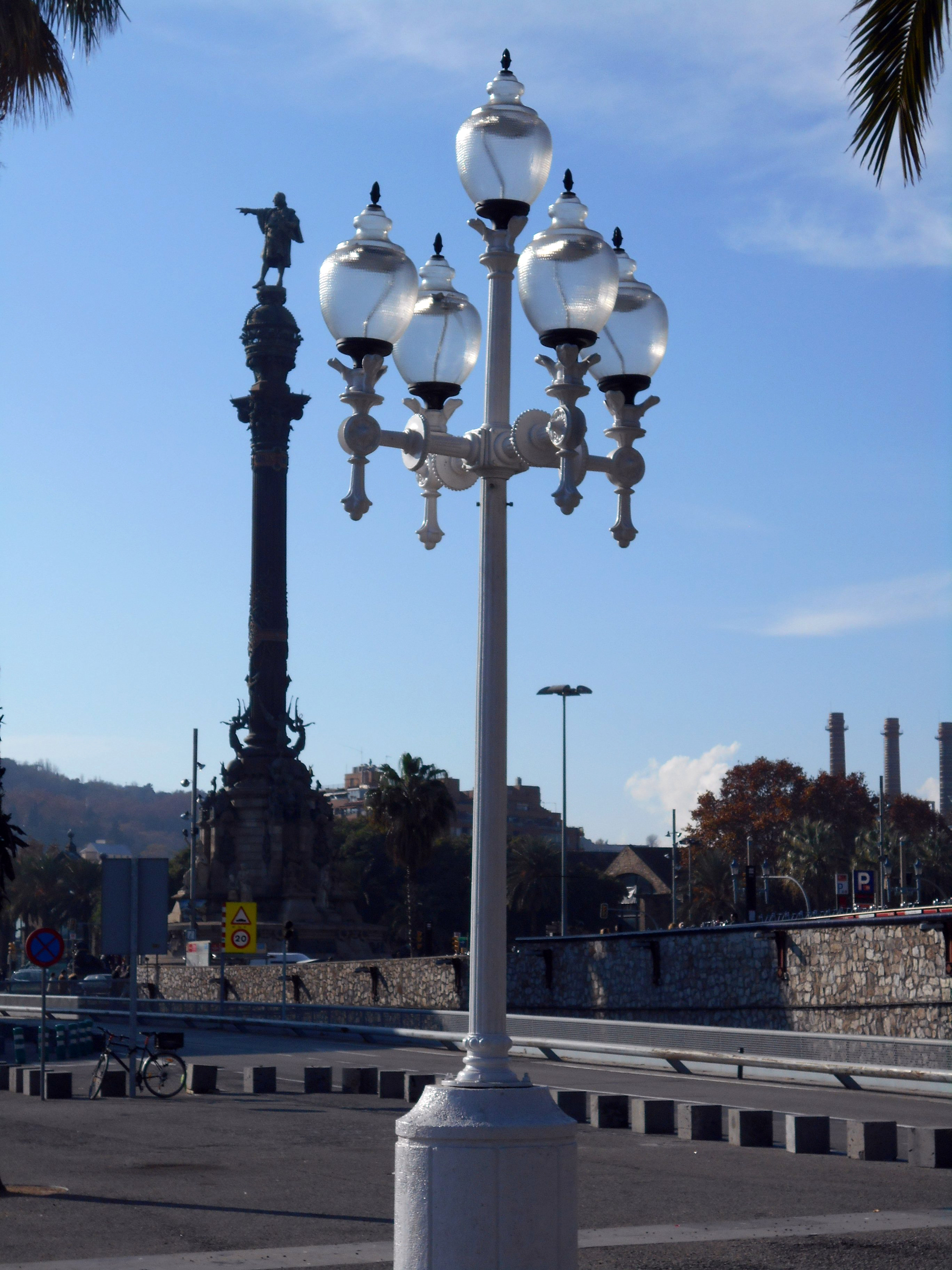
Ciutadella Model.

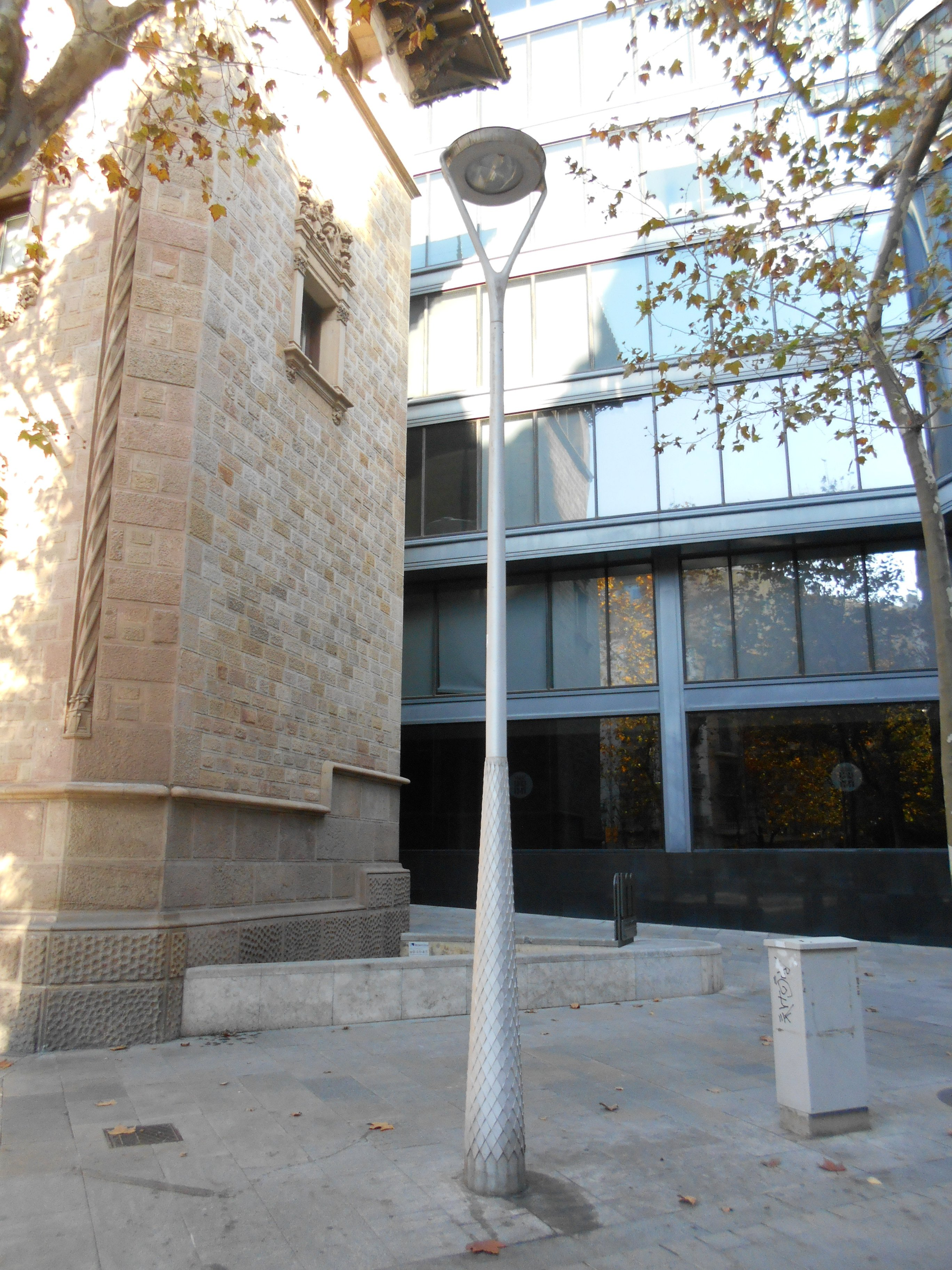
Eixample model.

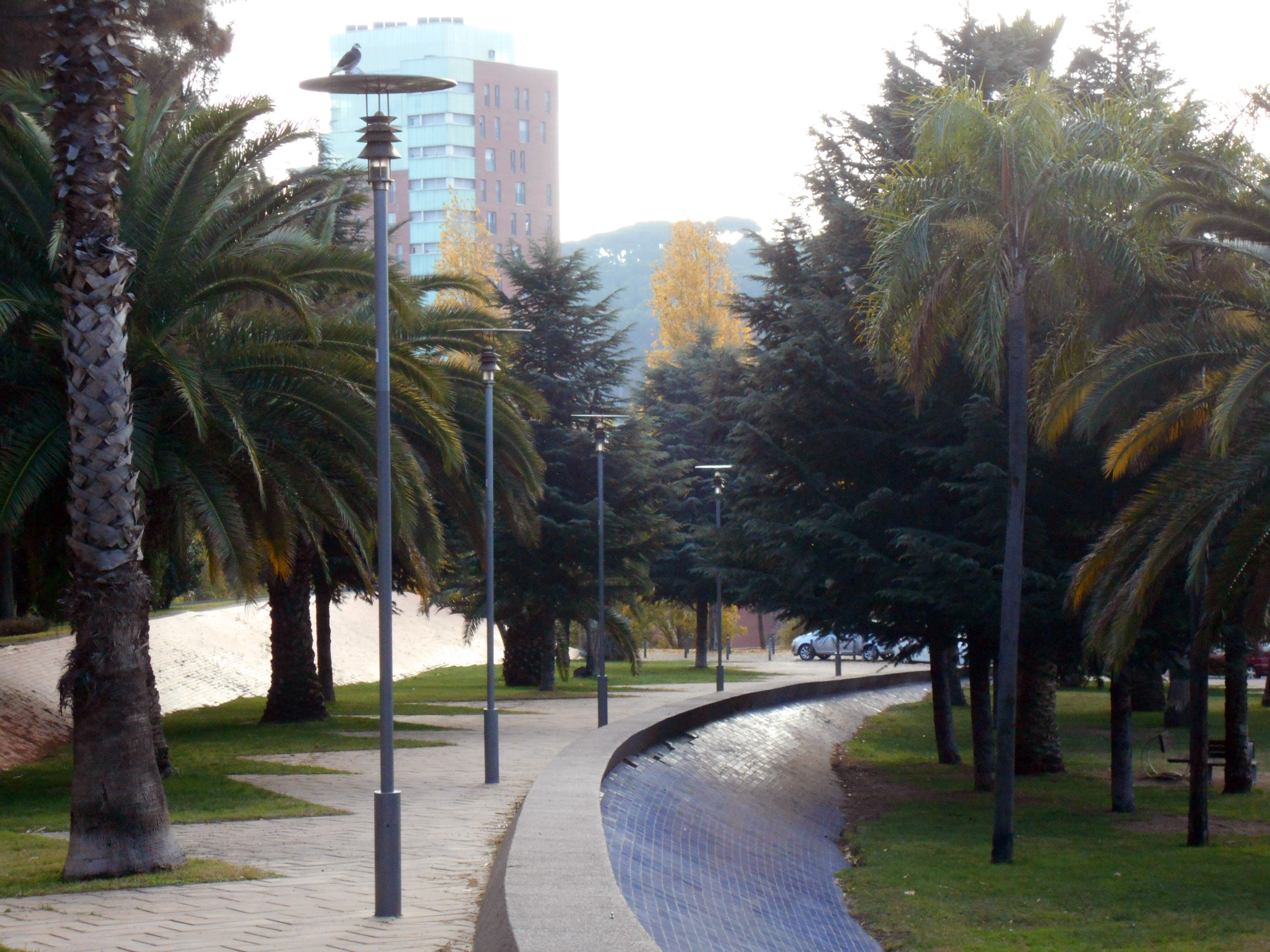
Pagode model.

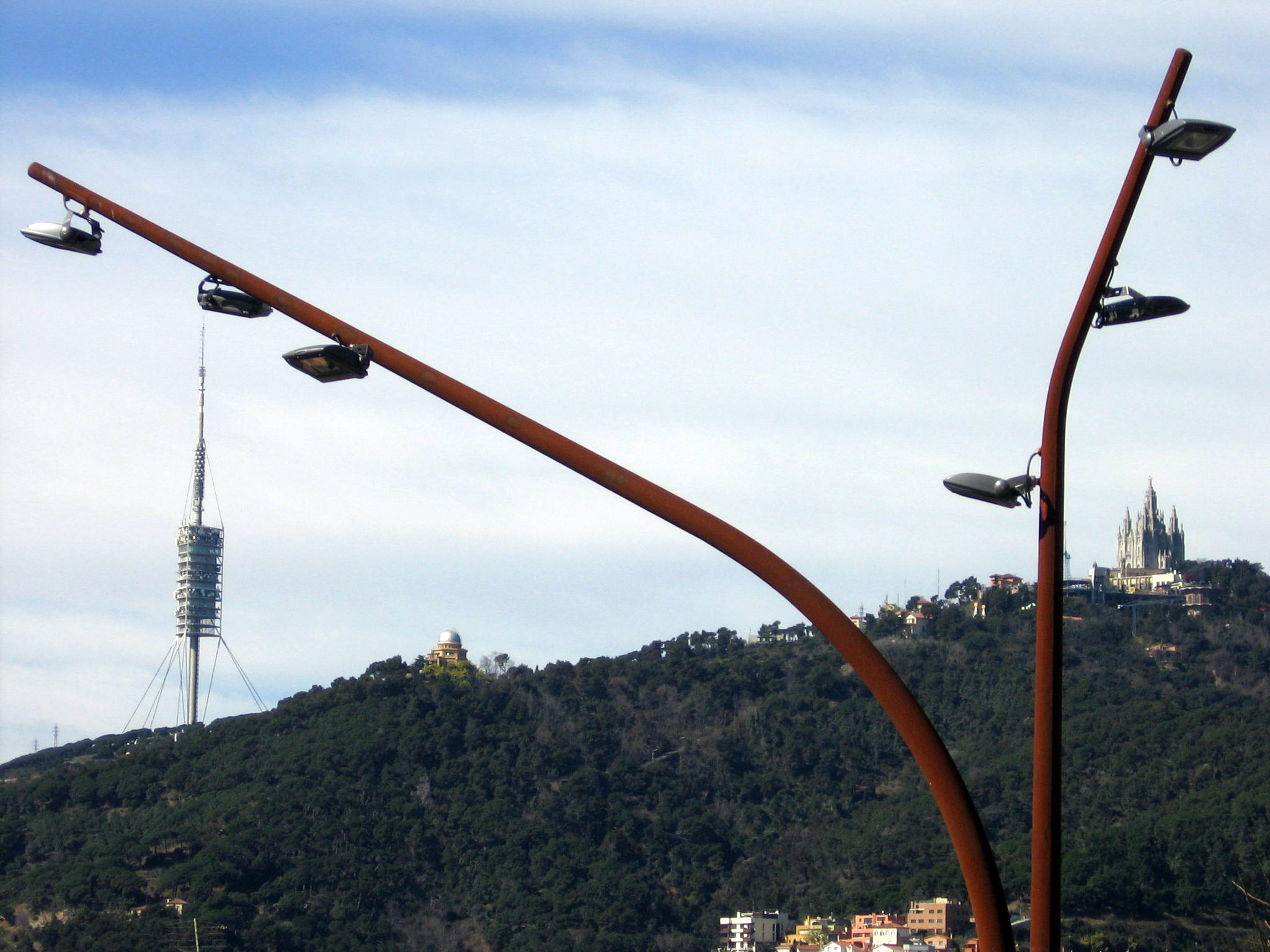
Ful model.

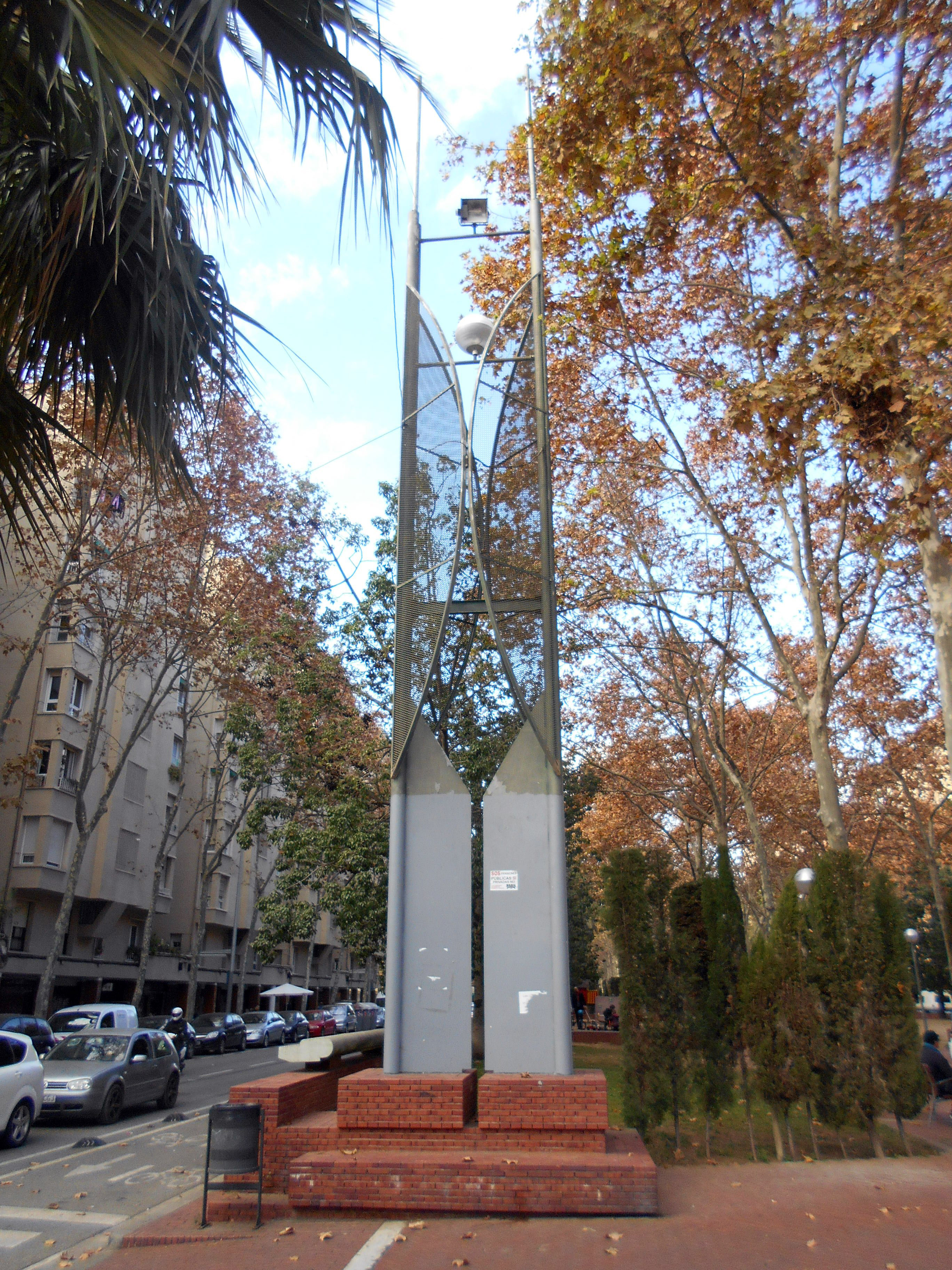
Street light on Rambla de Prim.

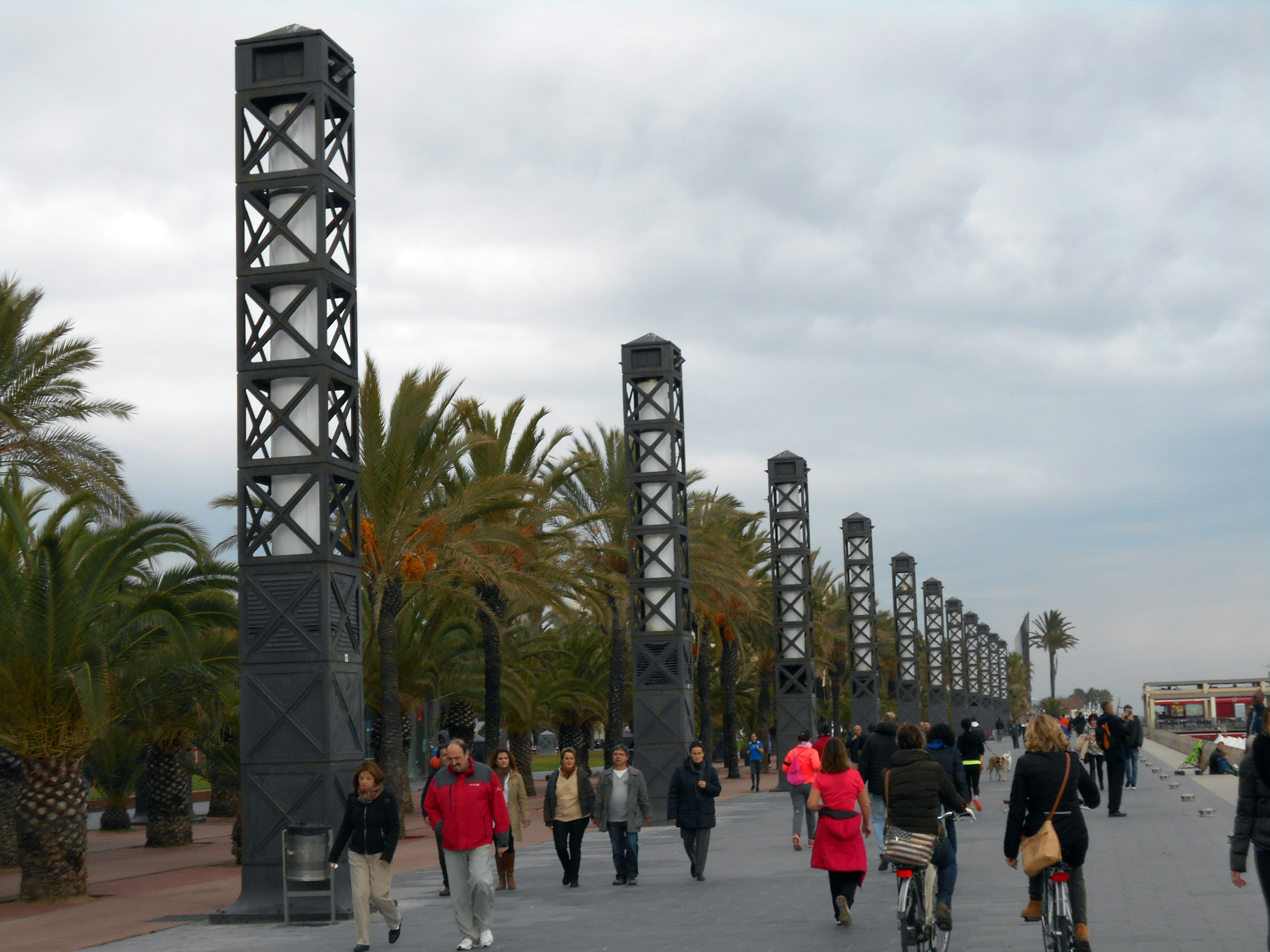
Andrea model.

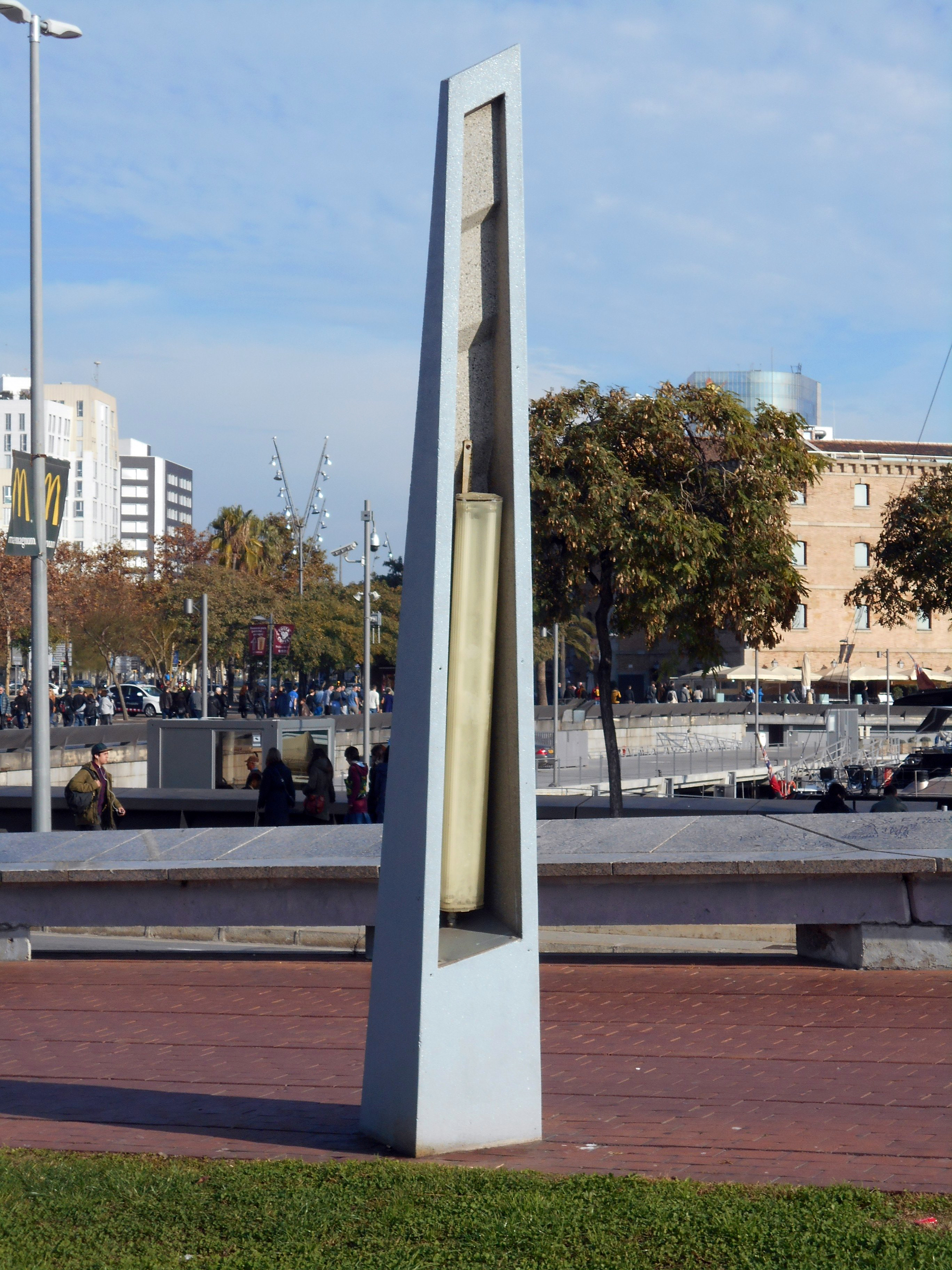
Llum-i model.

== See also ==
- Architecture of Barcelona
- Fountains of Barcelona
- History of Barcelona
- Parks and gardens of Barcelona
- Public art in Barcelona
- Street names in Barcelona
- Urban planning of Barcelona

== Bibliography ==
- Barcelona espai públic (in Catalan). Barcelona: Ajuntament de Barcelona. 1992. ISBN 84-7609-524-4.
- Enciclopèdia de Barcelona 1. 22@ / Ciutat Meridiana (in Catalan). Barcelona: Gran Enciclopèdia Catalana. 2006. ISBN 84-412-1395-X.
- Enciclopèdia de Barcelona 2. Ciutat Vella / Govern Militar (in Catalan). Barcelona: Gran Enciclopèdia Catalana. 2006. ISBN 84-412-1396-8.
- Enciclopèdia de Barcelona 3. Gràcia / Petritxol (in Catalan). Barcelona: Gran Enciclopèdia Catalana. 2006. ISBN 84-412-1397-6.
- Enciclopèdia de Barcelona 4. Pi / Zurich (in Catalan). Barcelona: Gran Enciclopèdia Catalana. 2006. ISBN 84-412-1398-4.
- Gaudí 2002. Miscel·lània (in Catalan). Barcelona: Planeta. 2002. ISBN 84-9708-093-9.
- La U urbana. El llibre blanc dels carrers de Barcelona (in Catalan). Barcelona: Foment de les Arts i del Disseny. 2009. ISBN 978-84-613-3637-1.
- Barral i Altet, Xavier; Beseran, Pere; Canalda, Sílvia; Guardià, Marta; Jornet, Núria (2000). Guia del Patrimoni Monumental i Artístic de Catalunya (in Catalan). Vol. I. Barcelona: Pòrtic. ISBN 84-7306-947-1.
- Bassegoda i Nonell, Joan (1989). El gran Gaudí (in Spanish). Sabadell: Ausa. ISBN 84-86329-44-2.
- Bellmunt, Jordi; Garcès, Joaquim (1990). Mobiliario urbano. Catálogo'90 (in Spanish). Barcelona: Barcelona Centro de Diseño. ISBN 84-404-7005-3.
- Esparza Lozano, Danae (2010). El Modelo Barcelona de espacio público y diseño urbano. La configuración del suelo y de una imagen de la ciudad (in Spanish). Barcelona: Universitat de Barcelona. hdl:2445/14802.
- Espinàs, Josep Maria; García-Martín, Manuel (1976). Els fanals de gas: nostàlgia d'una Barcelona pretèrita (in Catalan). Barcelona: Catalana de Gas i Electricitat S.A. ISBN 84-400-1920-3.
- Gausa, Manuel; Cervelló, Marta; Pla, Maurici (2002). Barcelona: guía de arquitectura moderna 1860-2002 (in Spanish). Barcelona: ACTAR. ISBN 84-89698-47-3.
- Giordano, Carlos; Palmisano, Nicolás (2007). Park Güell (in Spanish). Barcelona: Dos de Arte Ediciones. ISBN 978-84-934493-6-0.
- Hostalrich, María José; Tortajada, Manuel (1998). Llums. Història de l'enllumenat públic del segle XX (in Catalan). Barcelona: SECE.
- Lacuesta, Raquel; González, Antoni (1999). Barcelona, guía de arquitectura 1929-2000 (in Spanish). Barcelona: Gustavo Gili. ISBN 84-252-1801-2.
- Lecea, Ignasi de; Fabre, Jaume; Grandas, Carme; Huertas, Josep M.; Remesar, Antoni; Sobrequés, Jaume (2009). Art públic de Barcelona (in Catalan). Barcelona: Ayuntamiento de Barcelona and Àmbit Serveis Editorials. ISBN 978-84-96645-08-0.
- Parraguez, Nicolás (2013). Modelo Barcelona de espacio público y diseño urbano. El mobiliario urbano en la cualificación del espacio público (in Spanish). Barcelona: Universitat de Barcelona.
- Roig, Josep L. (1995). Historia de Barcelona (in Spanish). Barcelona: Primera Plana S.A. ISBN 84-8130-039-X.
- Sánchez Vidiella, Àlex (2008). Atlas de arquitectura del paisaje (in Spanish). Barcelona: Loft. ISBN 978-84-92463-27-5.
- Sánchez Vidiella, Àlex; Zamora Mola, Francesc (2011). Paisatgisme urbà. Barcelona (in Catalan). Barcelona: Ajuntament de Barcelona. ISBN 978-84-9850-355-5.
- Serra, Josep Maria (2000). Manual d'elements urbans. Mobiliari i microarquitectura (in Catalan). Barcelona: Diputació de Barcelona. ISBN 84-7794-715-5.
- Viladevall-Palaus, Ignasi (2004). "Cincuenta parques, más dos". Cuadernos Cívicos la Vanguardia (in Spanish). Barcelona.
