= Siber =

Siber may refer to:

== People ==
- George Siber (born 1944), American-Canadian medical researcher
- Gustav Siber (1864–1927), Swiss sculptor and builder
- Helmut Siber (born 1942), Austrian footballer and manager
- Sibel Siber (born 1960), Turkish Cypriot politician

== Vehicles ==
- GAZ Volga Siber, a 2008–2010 Russian mid-size sedan

== See also ==
- Siberia, a geographical region in Russia
- Siberia (disambiguation)
- Sibir (disambiguation)
