= Fountains of Zurich =

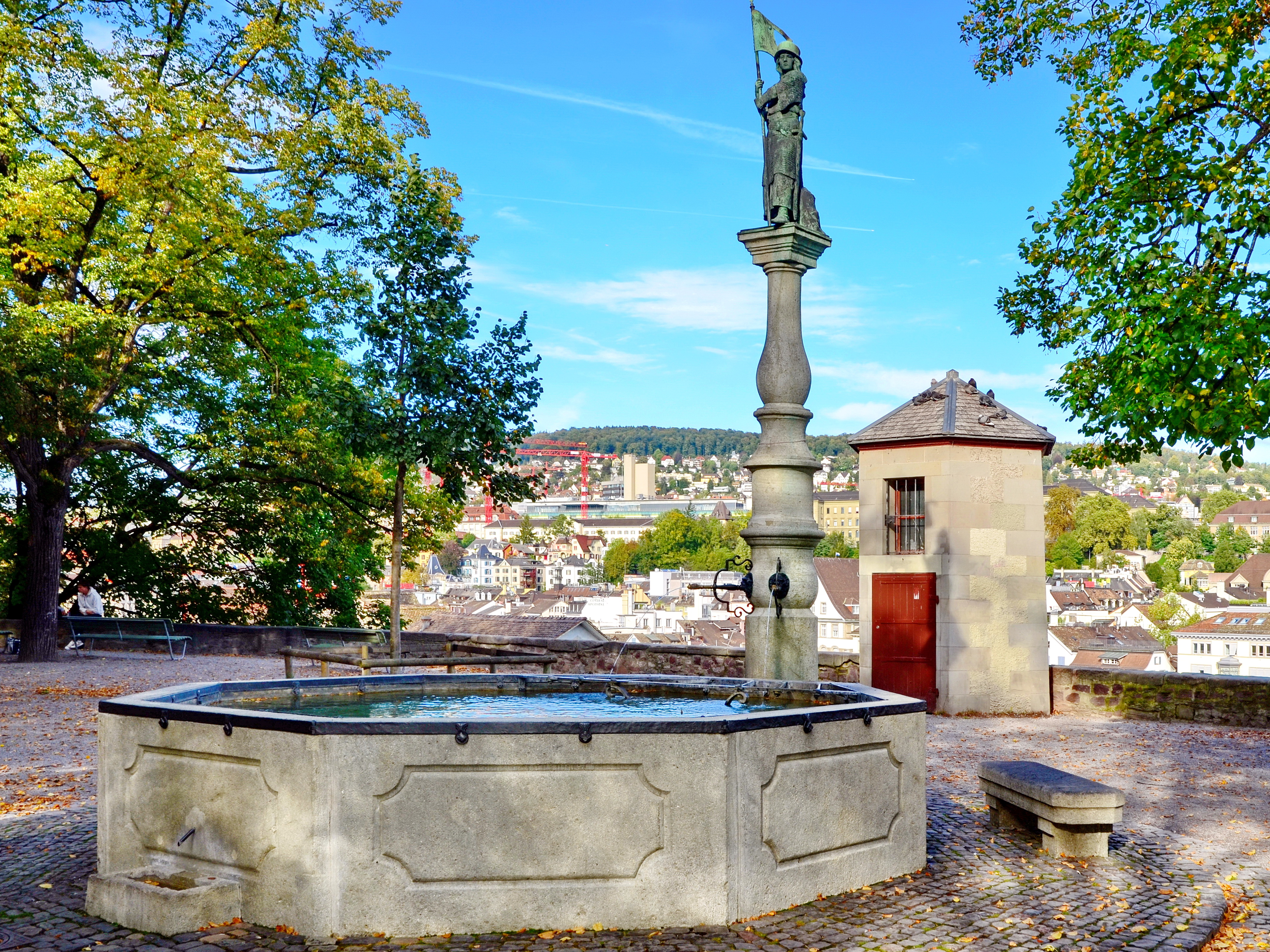
Hedwig Fountain on Lindenhof hill

The city of Zurich, Switzerland, contains around 1,200 public fountains, a total which is one of the highest in the world. It equates to 11 fountains per square kilometre (km^{2}), a number which is second only to Barcelona, which has 18 per km^{2}. Paris is third (10). The city's first fountain was erected in 1430; by 1921, the total was 328.

Around 70 percent of the city's fountain water is sourced from Lake Zurich, delivered to end consumers by around 1,550 kilometres (960 mi) of pipes. The remaining 30 per cent is drawn from natural springs and groundwater. During power outages, fresh water can be delivered from 80 emergency fountains which are fed by gravity.

Notable fountains in the city include Europuddle, Hedwig Fountain and in the statue of Alfred Escher.

== Selected list of fountains ==
Junobrunnen

Napfbrunnen

- Bronze Dog Fountain
- Europuddle (2019)
- Statue of Alfred Escher (1889)
- Fischmarktbrunnen (lit. 'Fish Market Fountain'), also known as Samson Fountain
- Hedwigbrunnen (lit. 'Hedwig Fountain') (1912)
- Herkulesbrunnen (lit. 'Hercules Fountain')
- Junobrunnen (lit. 'Juno Fountain'), Bahnhofstrasse (before 1872)
- Münsterhof Brunnen (lit. 'Münsterhof Fountain'), Münsterhof
- Napfbrunnen (lit. 'Napf Fountain')
- Predigerkirche Fountain, Niederdorf
- Sardonabrunnen (lit. 'Sardona Fountain'), Limmatquai (2020)
- Stüssibrunnen (lit. 'Stüssi Fountain'), named for mayor Rudolf Stüssi (1911)
- Waldmannbrunnen (lit. 'Waldmann Fountain'), named for former mayor Hans Waldmann
- Wasserspiel Aquaretum (lit. 'Aquaretum Fountain')
- Zentralhof Fountain

== See also ==
- Fountains of Barcelona
