= Plaça Catalana, Barcelona =

Public square in Barcelona

Coordinates: 41°25′18″N 2°10′23″E

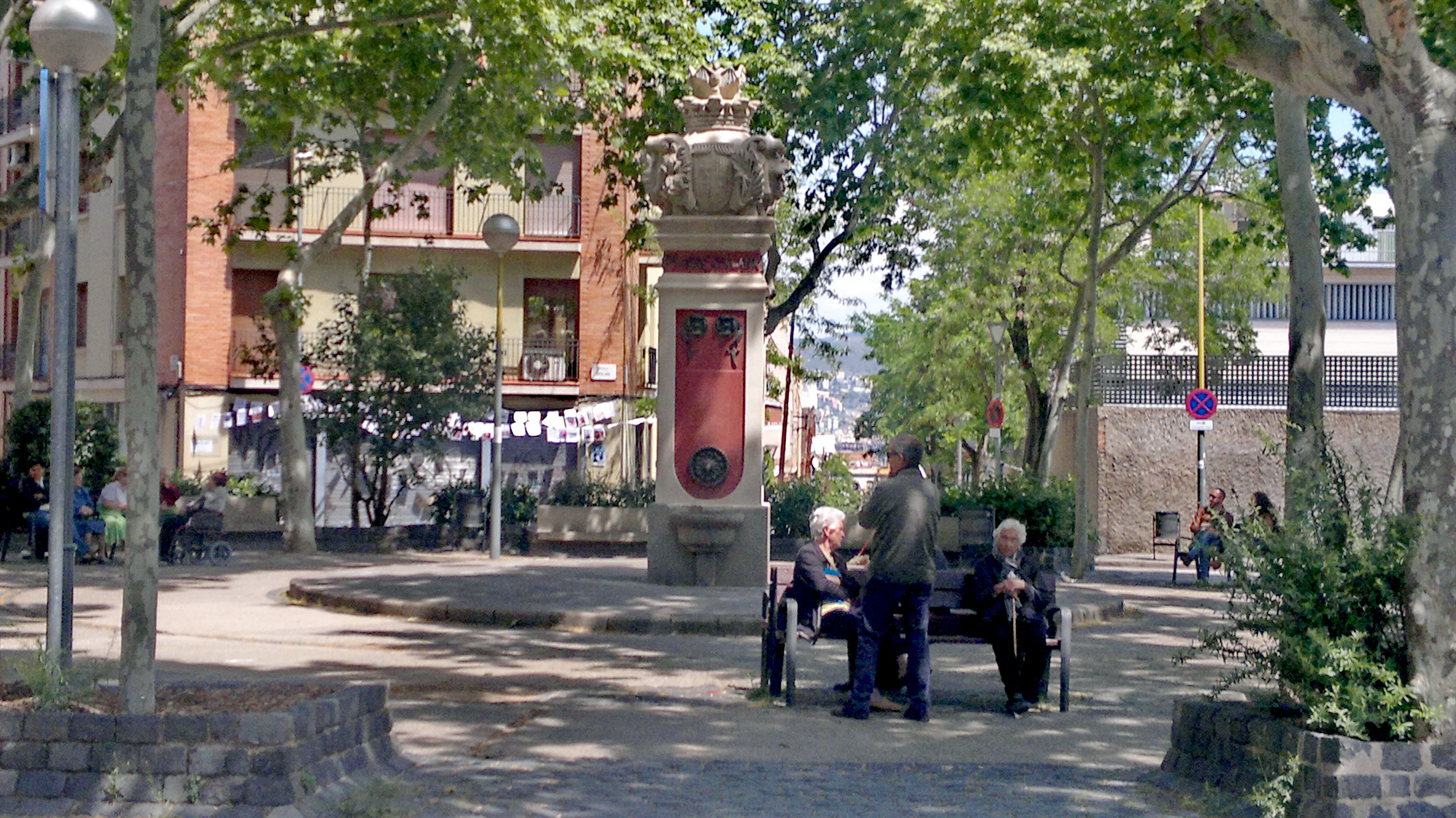
Plaça Catalana

Plaça Catalana (Catalan: [ˈplasə kətəˈlaɲə]; "Catalan Square") is a square in the Horta-Guinardó district of Barcelona, Catalonia, Spain. It's known for the historic public fountain located at the center.

== History ==
Previously known as Plaça de la Font Catalana ("Square of the Catalan Fountain"), it was built at the same time as the Plaça de la Font Castellana ("Square of the Castilian Fountain") located at the Avinguda de la Mare de Déu de Montserrat.

A spring had fed the fountain in the center since at least the mid-19th century. In 1907, heavy rains caused a landslide that blocked the spring. Eventually, the fountain was supplied with running water. After the Spanish Civil War, the letters at the top of the fountain were destroyed, with the intent of erasing any trace of Catalan language.
