= Europuddle =

Fountain in Zurich, Switzerland

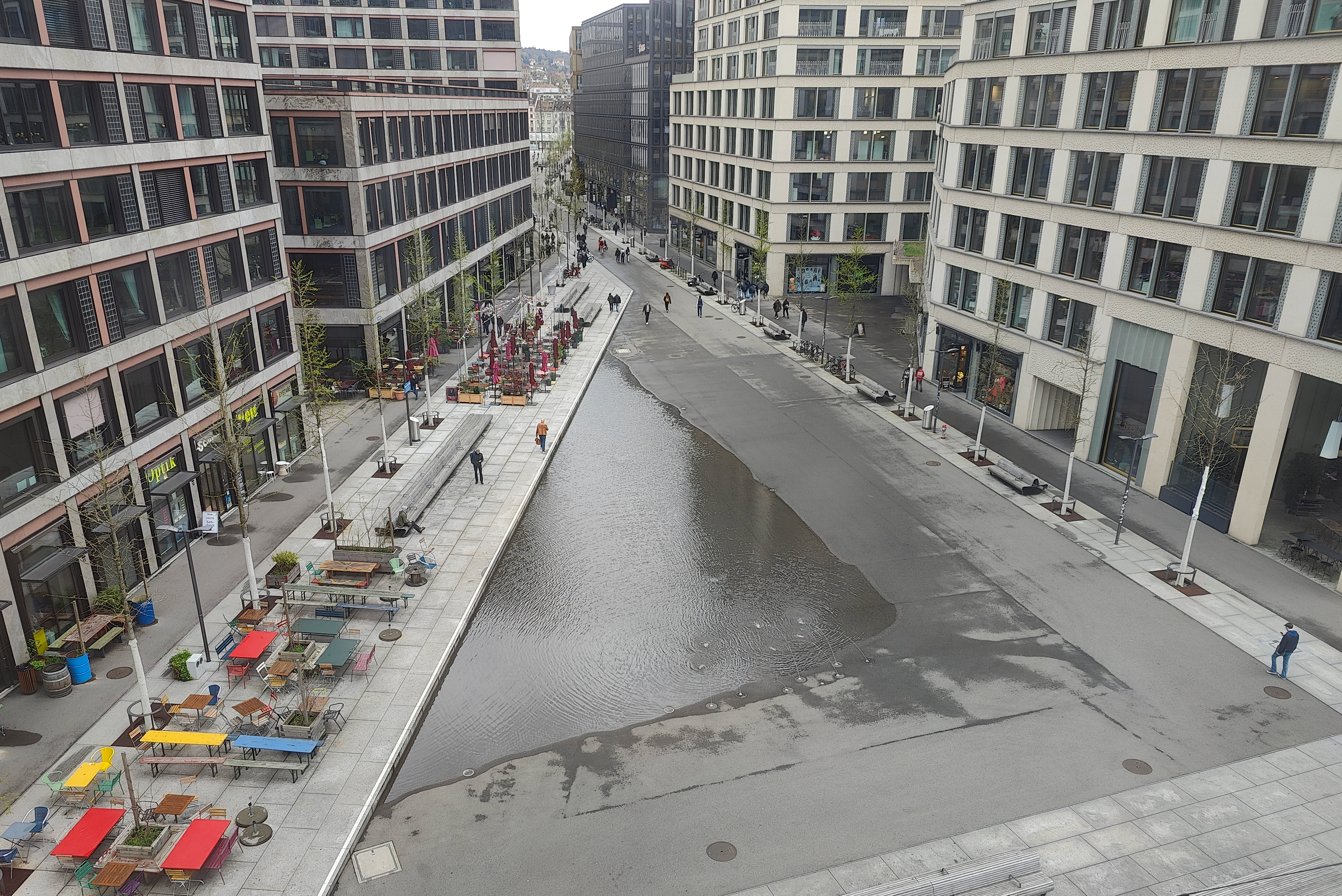
- The Europuddle as seen from above. Jets can be seen near the right corner.
- Year: 2019 (7 years ago)
- Type: Fountain
- Medium: tarmac
- Location: Zürich; 47°22′45″N 8°31′54″E

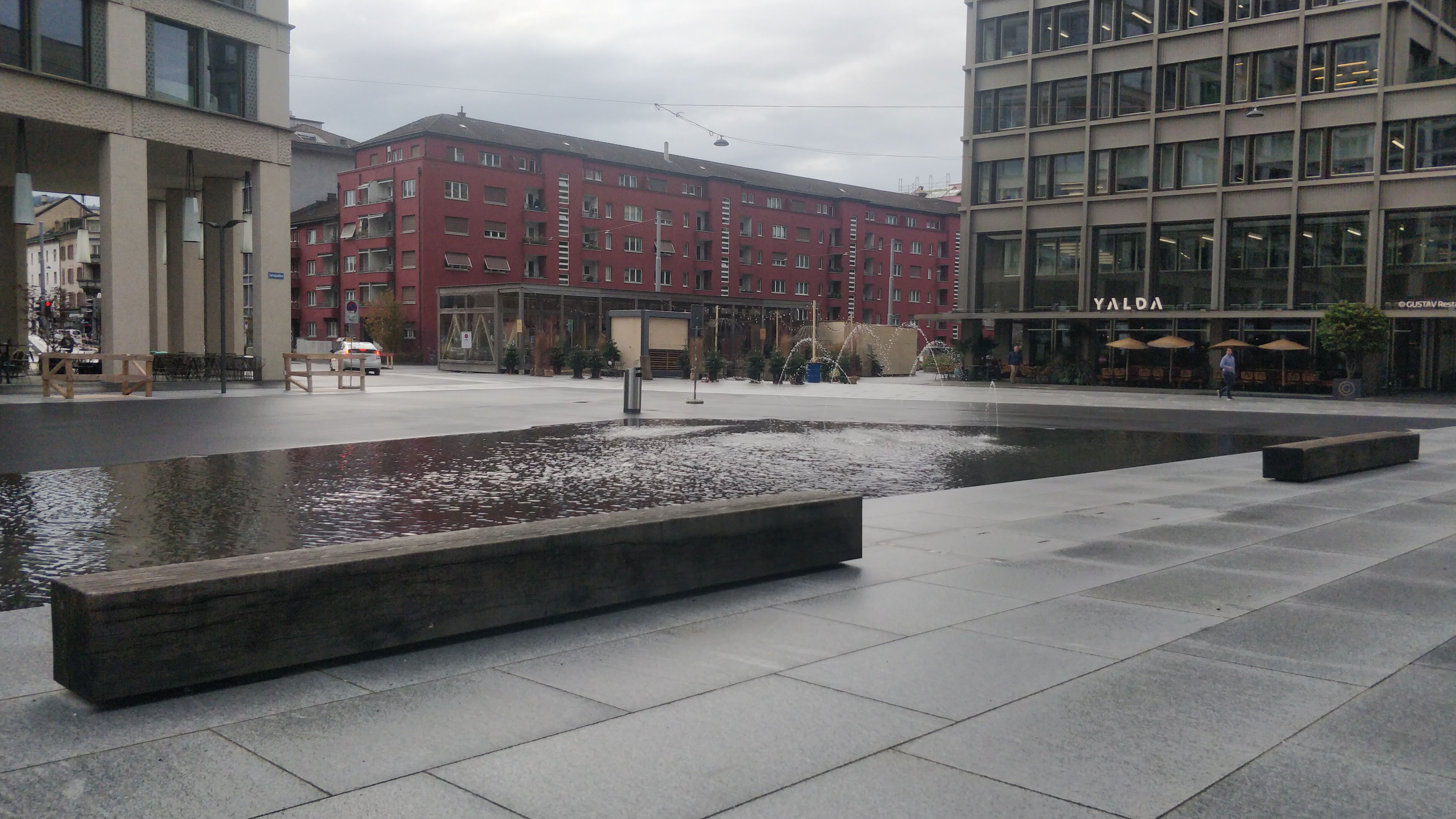
The side view of the Europuddle, with the jets closed. Building G of the Europaallee complex is visible on the right side of the image.

The Europuddle (French: Europuddle, German: Europfütze) is a fountain completed in November 2019, located in the Europaallee area in the city centre of Zurich, Switzerland. Its name is a portmanteau derived from "Europaallee", the residential and commercial area in which it belongs, and "puddle", due to its visual appearance. Unlike a traditional fountain, the Europuddle is contained on only one side by slightly elevated white pavement stone. The tarmac surface beneath the water slopes gently towards the elevated pavement, making the body of water visually similar to a puddle.

== Construction ==
The Europuddle is about 10 metres (33 ft) wide and 60 metres (200 ft) long, with a maximum depth of about 20 centimetres (7.9 in). Seven identical water jets at the western edge of the Europuddle create a fountain by jetting water eastward into the puddle.

The jets of water alternate between three states :

- off: in the absence of flowing water jets, the Europuddle is transformed into a mirror of water reflecting surrounding buildings.
- static: the jets have equal, constant water flow, creating wavelets on the surface of the puddle.
- animated: the water jets vary their flow rate, creating animated ripple effects on the water body.

== See also ==
- Fountains of Zurich
