= Hedwig Fountain =

Fountain in Zurich, Switzerland

- Hedwigbrunnen (German)
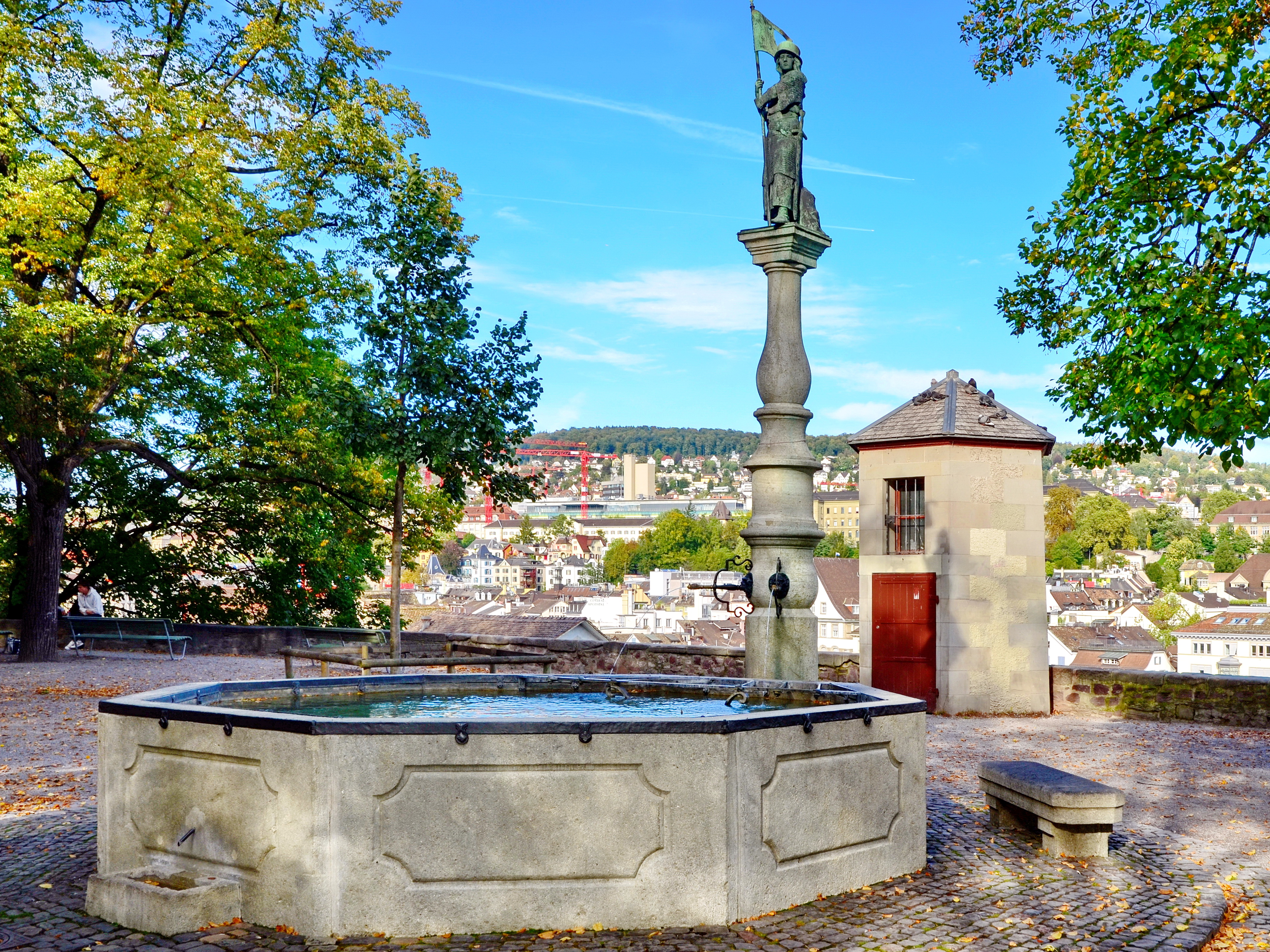
- Pictured in 2012, looking east
- Artist: Gustav Siber
- Year: 1912
- Type: Public fountain
- Medium: Stone
- Location: Lindenhof hill, Zurich, Switzerland; 47°22′22.289988″N 8°32′28.819968″E

The Hedwig Fountain (German: Hedwigbrunnen) or Lindenhof Fountain is a fountain in the Lindenhof hill in Zurich, Switzerland, which was built in 1912. The helmeted statue of a woman beside the fountain was made by Gustav Siber. It was built to honor the Zurich women, allegedly led by Hedwig ab Burghalden, who defended the city by duping the army of Duke Albert I of Germany during the siege of Zurich in 1292. They dressed in full battle gear in order to trick the Habsburg army into thinking that the city was well protected while their men were busy campaigning at Winterthur.

The fountain is among the roughly 400 fountains fed by the city's separate spring water network.

The fountain stands in front of Modestia cum Libertate Masonic Lodge.

== See also ==
- Fountains of Zurich
