= Modestia cum Libertate Masonic Lodge =

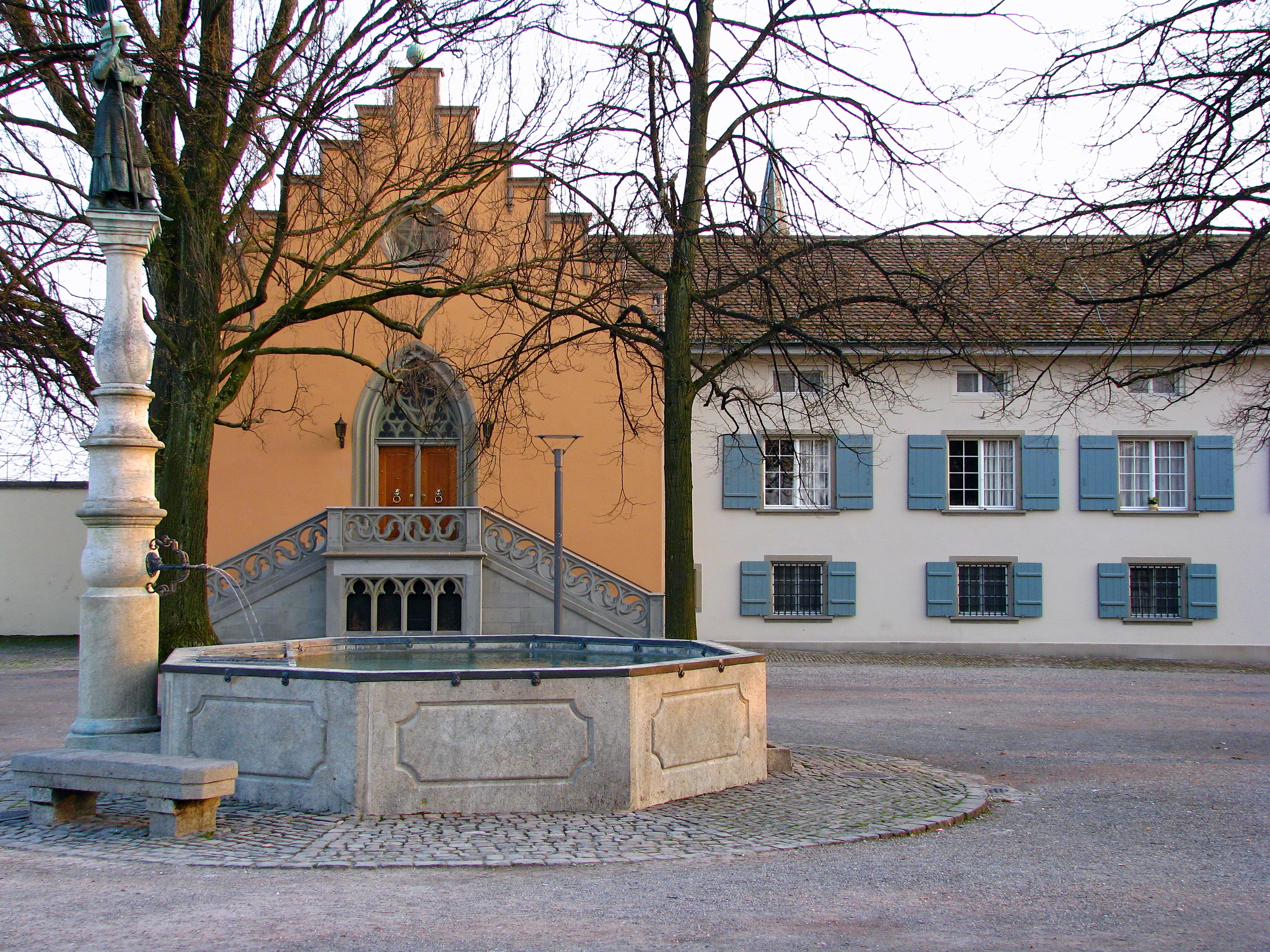
- Pictured in 2009, behind Hedwig Fountain

General information
- Location: Lindenhof hill
- Coordinates: 32.073115°N 81.094337°W
- Completed: 1854 (172 years ago)

Modestia cum Libertate Masonic Lodge is a building located in southeastern corner of Lindenhof hill public park, Zurich, Switzerland. Constructed in 1854, three years after brethren of the Modestia cum Libertate purchased the land on which it stands, replacing zum Paradies. It is the oldest Masonic lodge in Switzerland. During the night of January 26, 2026, the building was severely damaged by fire.
