= Gustav Siber =

Swiss sculptor

- Born: 22 November 1864; Küsnacht, Switzerland
- Died: 14 July 1927 (aged 62); Zurich, Switzerland
- Occupation: Sculptor

Gustav Siber (22 November 1864 – 14 July 1927) was a Swiss sculptor. He was noted for sculpting several of the fountains in Zurich.

== Biography ==
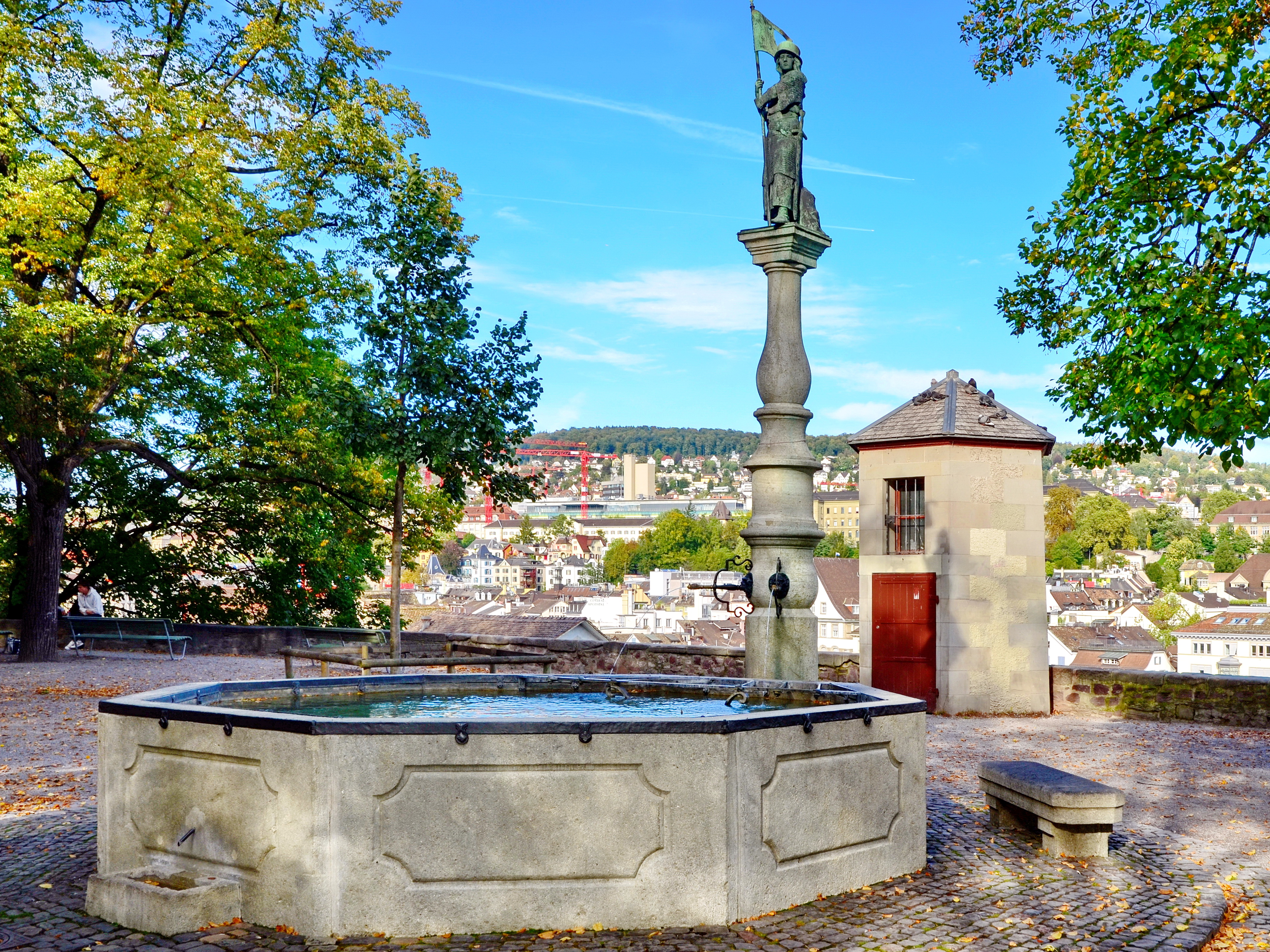
Hedwigbrunnen (Hedwig Fountain), Lindenhof hill, Zurich

Siber was born in 1864 in Küsnacht, Switzerland. He became a student of Richard Kissling, later studying with Henri Chapu in Paris.

After returning to Switzerland, he built a sculpting workshop at the winery of his father, Gustav Sr. (1833–1904), in Goldbach, Zurich.

Siber Jr. won the competition design to build the Telldenkmal (Tell Monument), which stands in Altdorf, but he was deemed to be too young and inexperienced for the project. Kissling was instead awarded it.

In 1893, Siber sculpted the Jonas-Furrer-Denkmal (Jonas Furrer Monument) in Winterthur. Eight years later, he created six reliefs for the Palais de Justice in Lausanne. Also in 1901, he created a grouping of statues which adorned the roof directly above the entrance of 2 Mythenquai in Zurich.

In 1904, Siber married Maria Martha Gugolz, with whom he had three children. She died in 1913, when the eldest child was eight.

In 1912, Siber sculpted the Hedwigbrunnen (Hedwig Fountain or Lindenhof Fountain), which stands on Lindenhof hill in Zurich.

Around 1913, after friction between him and his in-laws, he moved with his family (and new wife, Lilly Gull) to Lugano, where he became a builder. He sank all of his personal statues and models from the jetty in Goldbach.

In 1922, Siber built an Italian-style villa, im Siller, in Goldbach. He lived there until his death in 1927, aged 62.
