= Lindenhof hill =

Moraine hill and public square in Zurich, Switzerland

Coordinates: 47°22′23″N 8°32′27″E

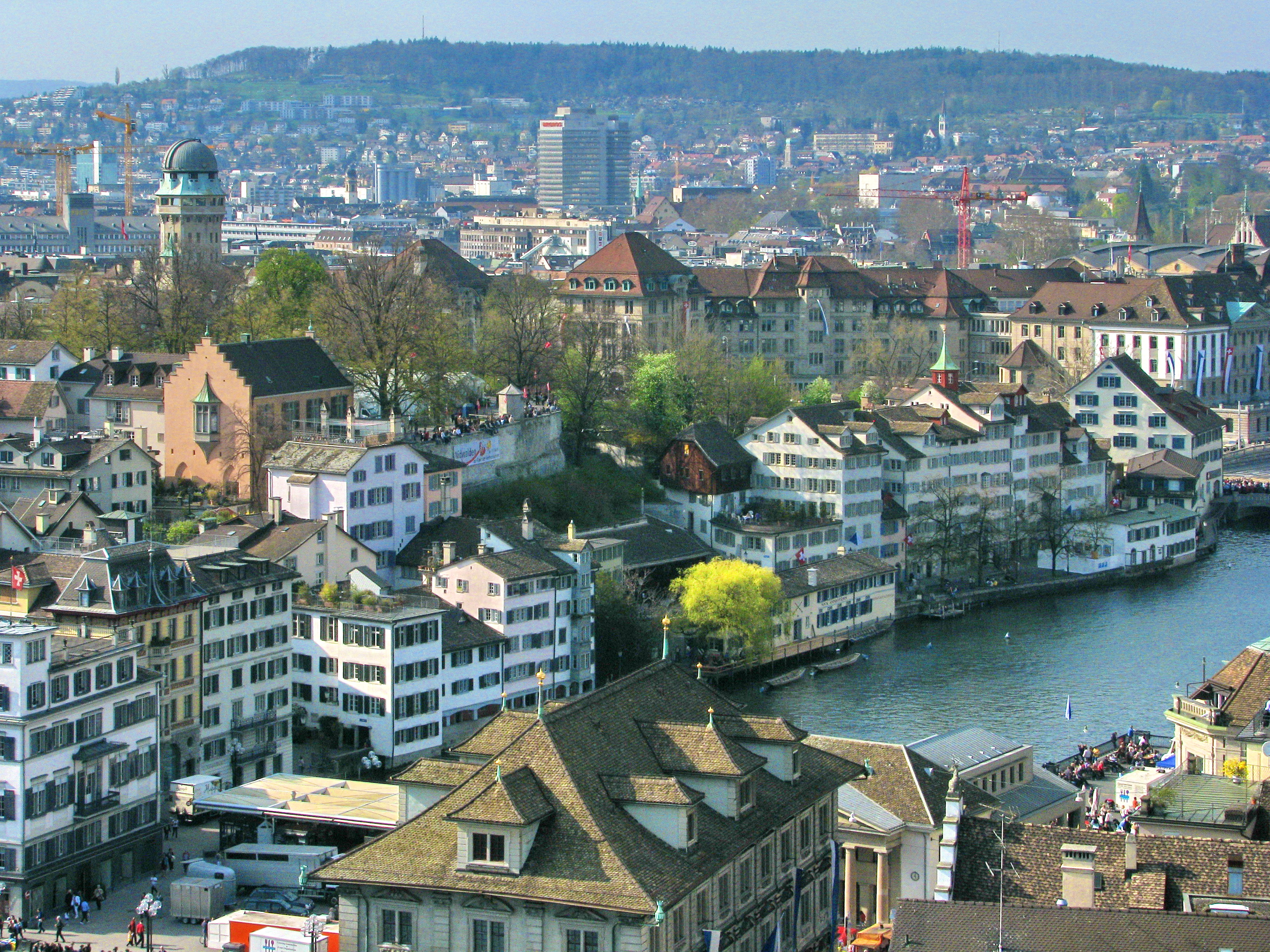
Schipfe quarter, Limmat, Lindenhof hill and Käferberg (in the background), as seen from Grossmünster (April 2010)

The Lindenhof ("linden yard") is a moraine hill and public square in the historic center of Zurich, Switzerland. It is the site of the Roman and Carolingian era Kaiserpfalz around which the city has historically grown. The hilltop area—including its prehistoric, Roman, and medieval remains—is listed as a Swiss heritage site of national significance.

== Topography ==
Lindenhof (its northern part is called Sihlbühl) dominates the Lindenhof quarter in district 1 (Altstadt), the historical center of Zurich's Altstadt. To the north, it bordered by Uraniastrasse and the Waisenhaus and to the south, it ends near St. Peter church. To the west, the hill is bordered by Bahnhofstrasse, and in the east, it ends at the Limmat and the Schipfe quarter.

Lindenhof sits atop the remains of a glacier. The hill and its public square are among the moraines left behind by the Linth Glacier in the Zurich area. The now largely flattened Lindenhof rises about 35 metres (115 ft) above the Limmat.

== History ==
=== Prehistory ===
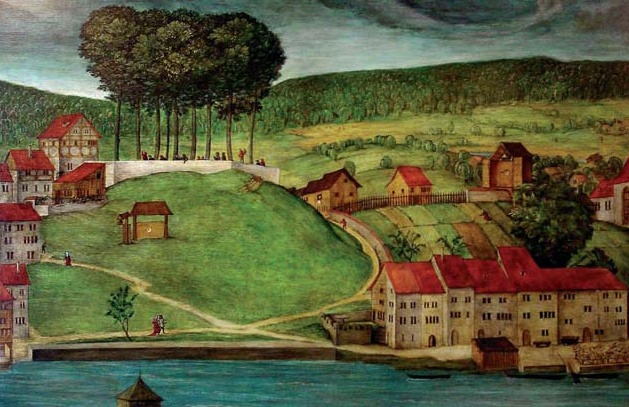
Lindenhof and Schipfe by Hans Leu the Elder (late 15th century)

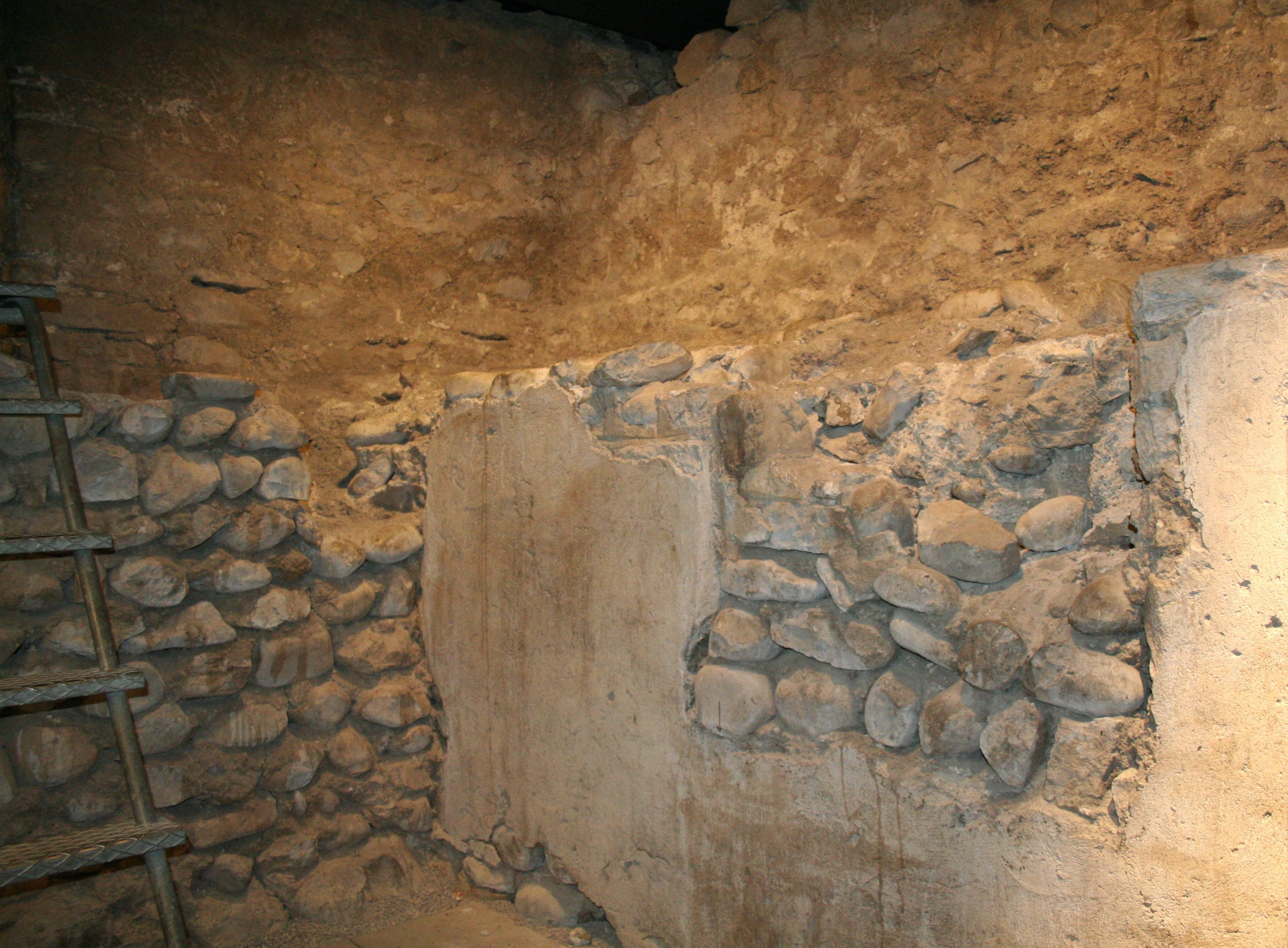
Celtic, Roman and medieval remains at Lindenhofkeller

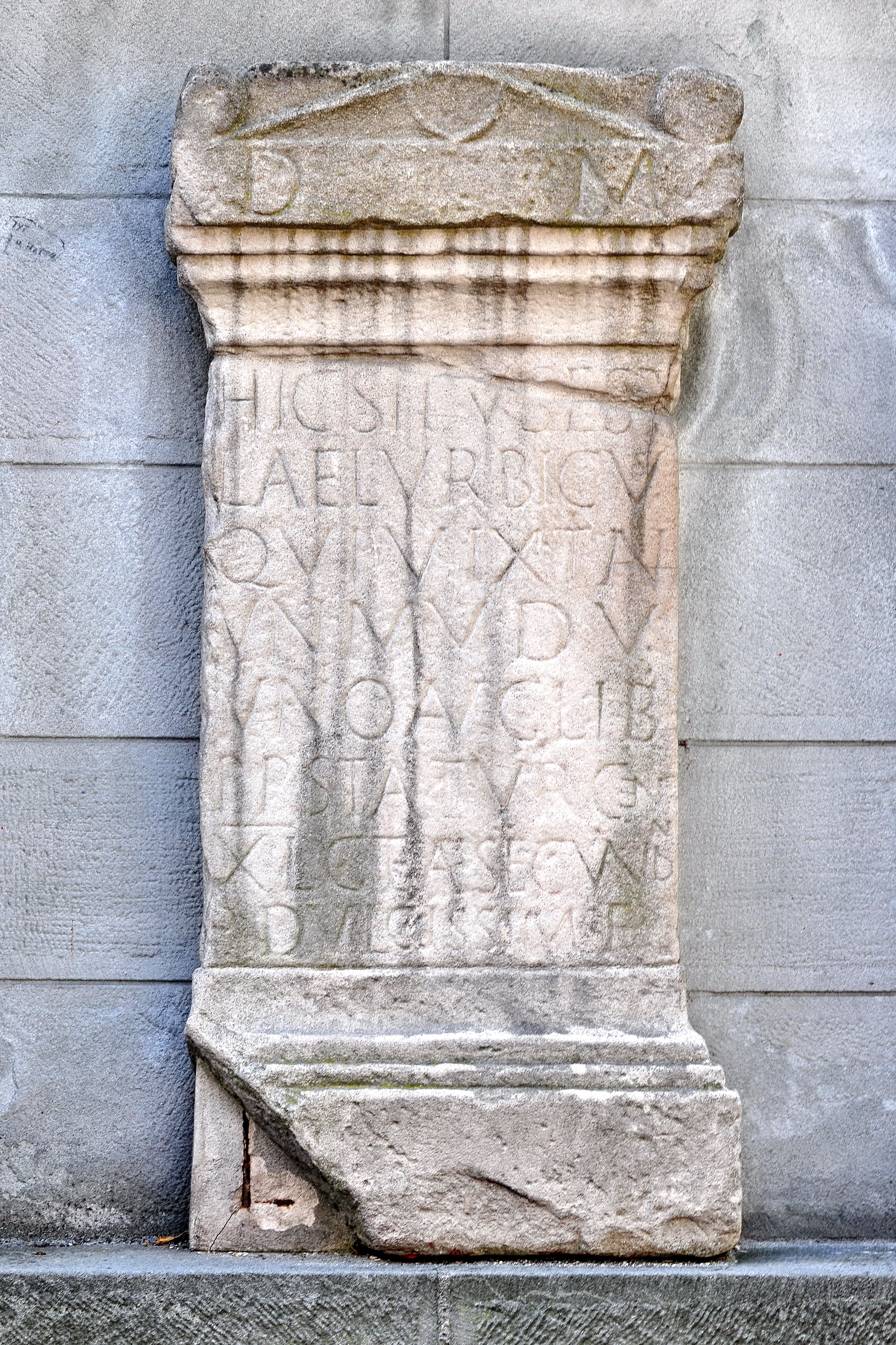
Lucius Aelius Urbicus' gravestone (200 AD) found at the upper part of Pfalzgasse at Lindenhof

At the flat shore of Lake Zurich were Neolithic and Bronze Age (4500 to 850 BC) lakeside settlements, such as Kleiner Hafner and Grosser Hafner (both small former islands west of Sechseläutenplatz, near Bauschänzli at the Stadthausquai, Alpenquai at Bürkliplatz and Lindenhof). Lindenhof was largely surrounded by water: until the early medieval area, neighboring Münsterhof (Fraumünster abbey square) was a swampy hollow flooded by the Sihl. Therefore, Lindenhof was an optimal location for early fortified settlements. Middle Bronze Age (1500 BC) artefacts were found near the Limmat (Schipfe). Archaeologists found remains of a Celtic Oppidum from the 1st century BC (La Tène culture), whose remains were found in archaeological campaigns in the years 1989, 1997, 2004 and 2007 at Lindenhof and Rennweg.

=== Roman Vicus ===
In 15 BC, Augustus's stepsons Drusus and Tiberius integrated the territory on the left side of Lake Zurich into the Roman provinces Raetia and Germania Superior. Several stone buildings from the Roman period were located on and around the hill. It was part of the small vicus Turicum, located on both sides of the Limmat and connected by a Roman bridge located near the present Rathausbrücke.

Turicum, Zurich's Roman name and possibly also its Celtic name, is engraved on a 2nd-century tombstone of a little boy. It was found on May 15, 1747, and it refers to the Roman STA(tio) TUR(i)CEN(sis). The tombstone is located in the Swiss National Museum; a copy is integrated in the Lindenhof wall on Pfalzgasse, leading to St. Peter church.

Using the topography, the Roman military built a citadel on top of the hill in the years of the Roman emperor Valentinian I (364–375), to defend migrations from the North by the Alamanni. It was 4500 square meters large, and it was fitted with 10 towers and two meter wide walls.

=== Medieval castle and graveyard ===
During the Middle Ages, the hilltop leveled fort became the retaining wall and gave the Lindenhof terrace a shape similar to its current one. The remains of the Roman camp were used as the center of the later fortification of the historical center of Zurich. Significant parts of the lime mortar and ancient castle walls were integrated into the townhouses around Lindenhof and a Kaiserpfalz (demolished in 1218), which served as a place of festivities, including the engagement of the German emperor Henry IV with Bertha von Turin on Christmas in 1055. The Roman castle's remains existed until the early medieval age: a Carolingian, later Ottonian Pfalz (1054) was built on its remains. This Kaiserpfalz was a long building with a chapel on the eastern side of the fortified hill; it is last mentioned in 1172, and it was derelict by 1218, when its remains were scavenged for construction of the city walls and stone masonry on private houses.

In 1937, archaeologists uncovered graves of late medieval children and adults that were oriented from the east to the west. In the year 1384, a chapel on the Lindenhof was mentioned, but no remains have been found. It is believed that the chapel was part of the route of church processions including the Wasserkirche, Grossmünster, and Fraumünster that ended in 1524 or 1525 (Reformation in Zurich). These religious celebrations at Pentecost honored Zurich's Saints Felix and Regula and Exuperantius.

=== Modern public park ===
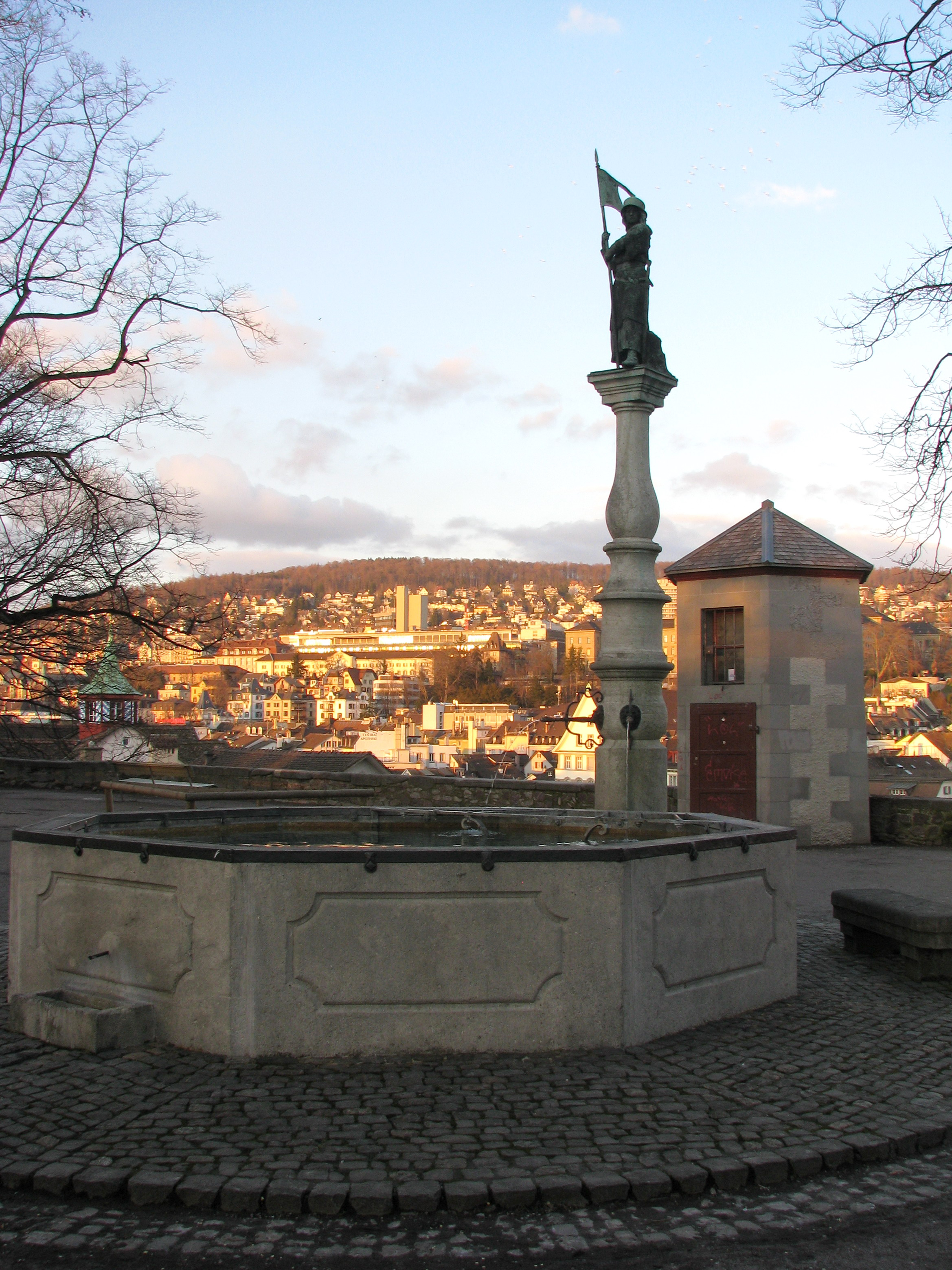
Hedwig Fountain and pump station

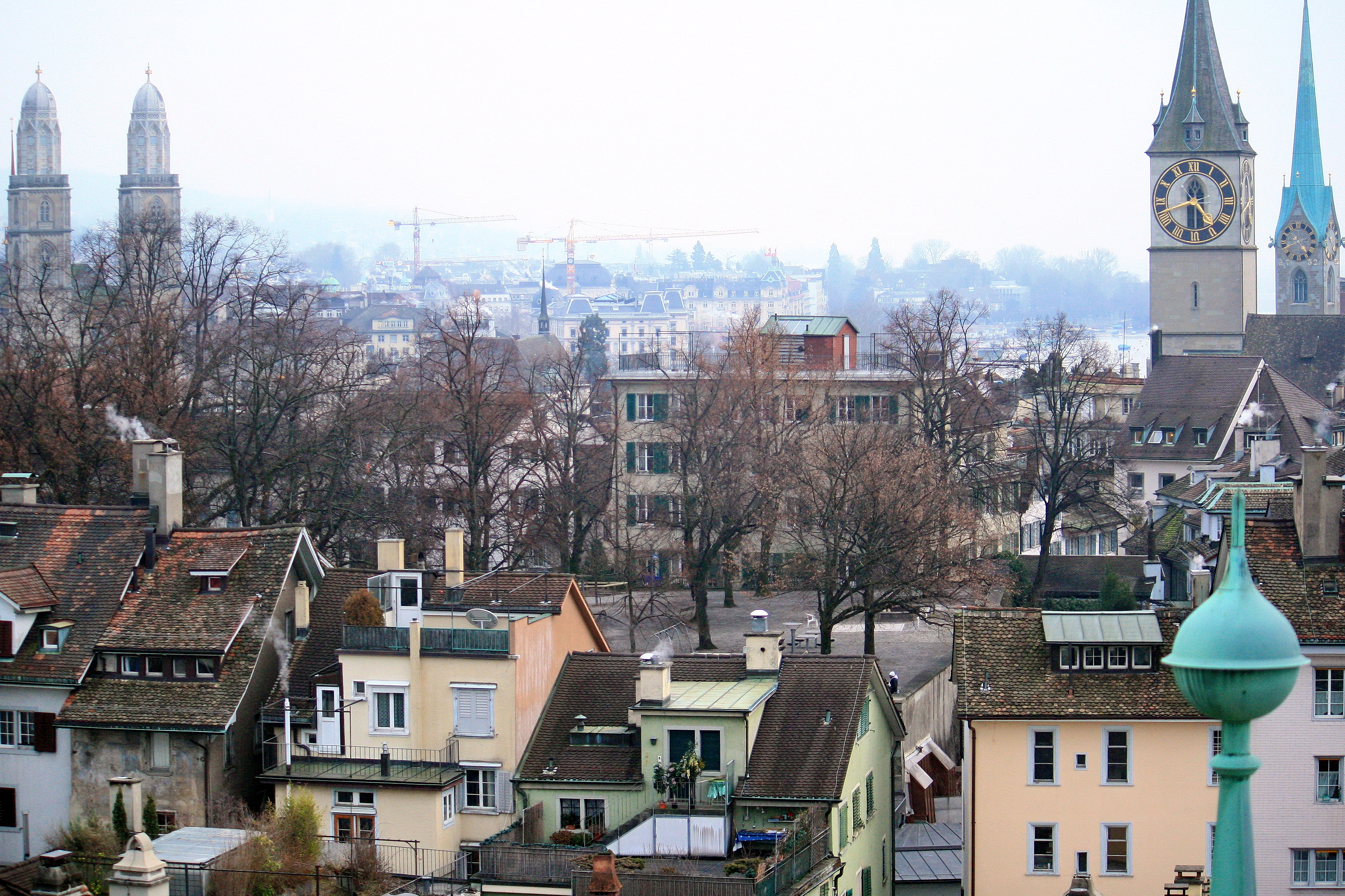
Lindenhof as seen from Urania Sternwarte

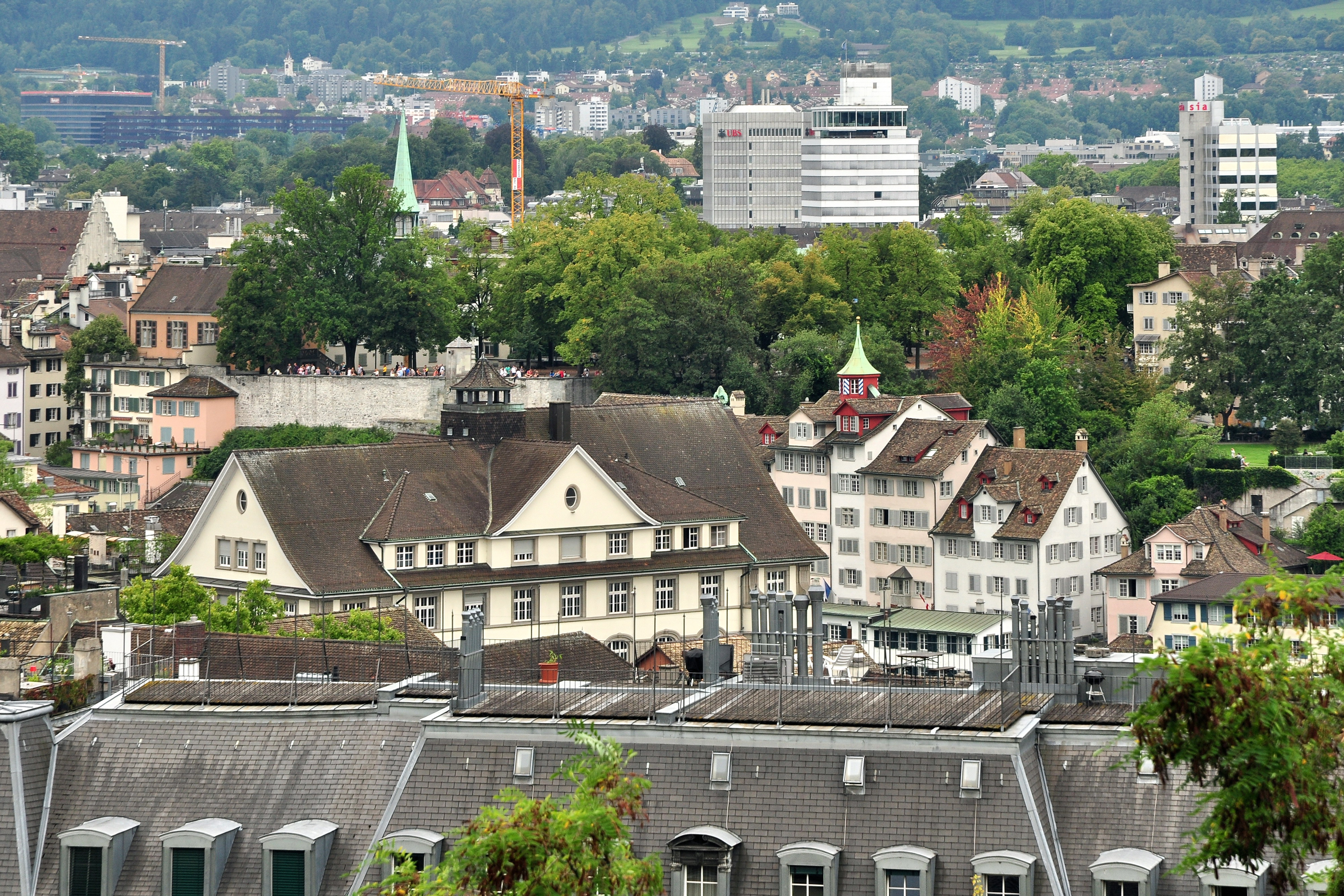
Lindenhof as seen from ETH Zurich plateau

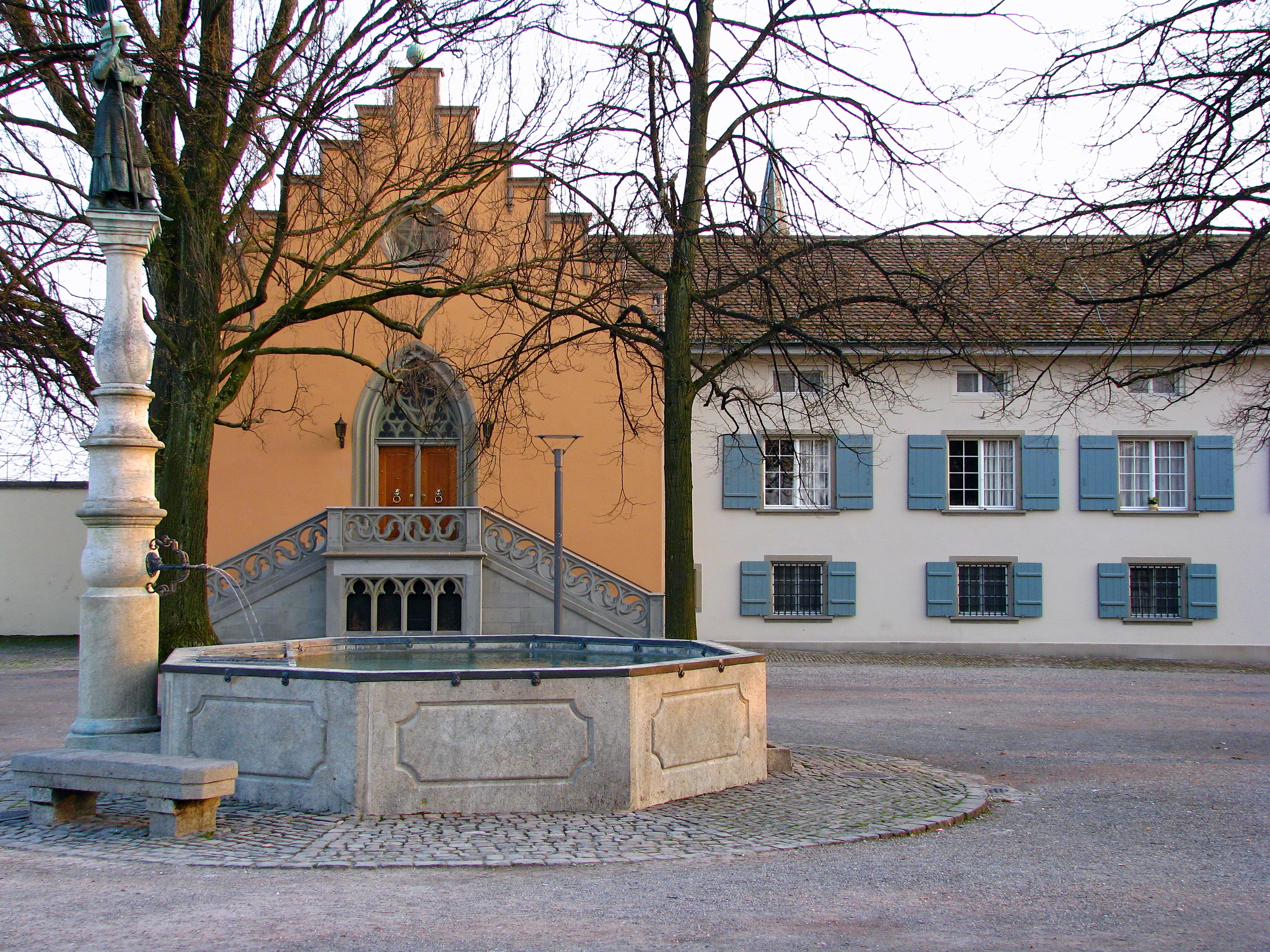
Modestia cum Libertate Masonic Lodge

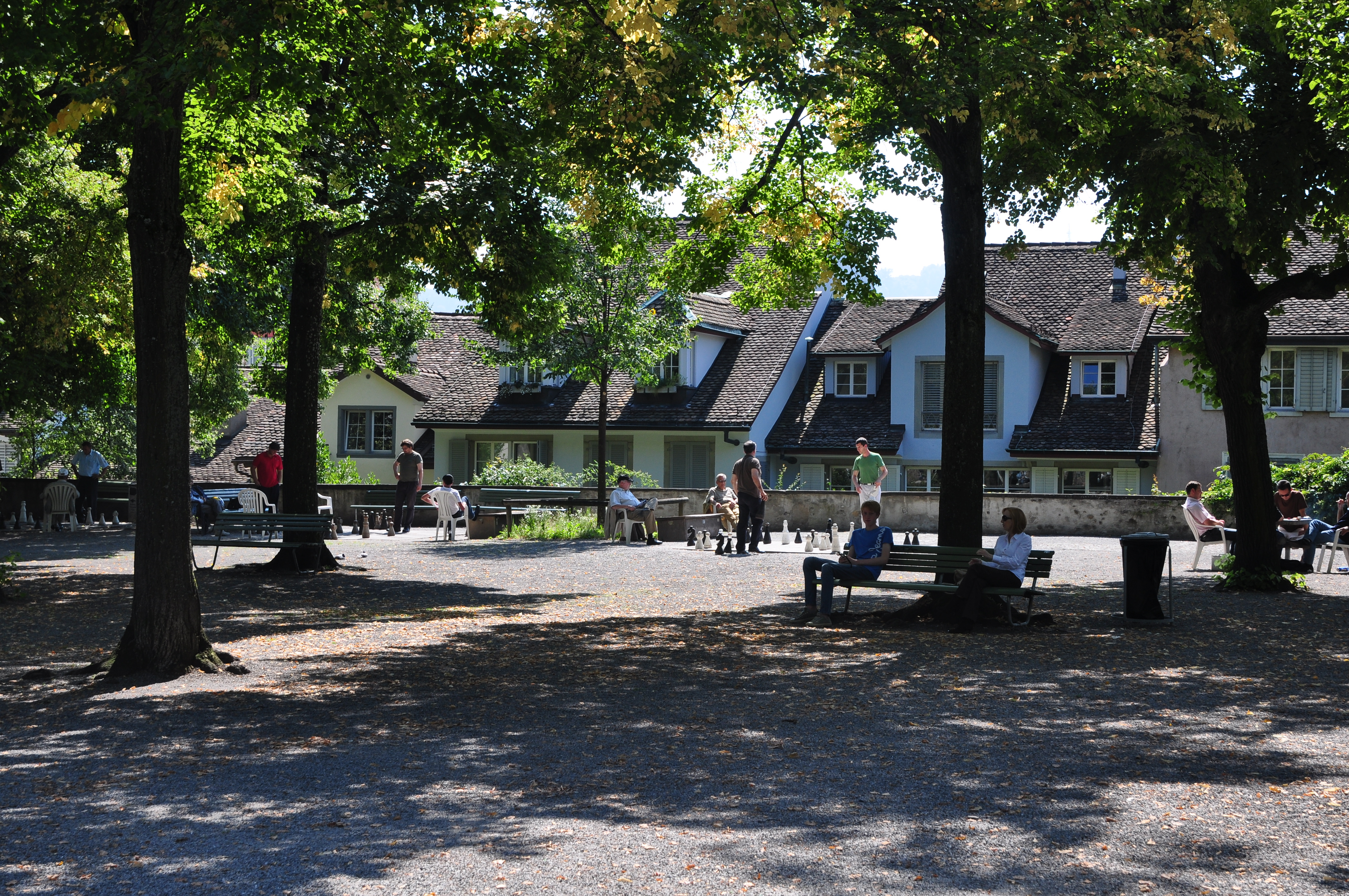
Lindenhof square

Following the demolition of the former royal residence, the hill—the only public park within the city walls—became an area for public life and relaxation, with dense tree vegetation, stone tables, crossbow stands, and bowling and chess; the latter are still very popular in modern times. According to a chronicle, fifty-two linden trees were planted in 1774. Bow and crossbow shooting was probably one of the most important leisure activities on the Lindenhof. Each Zurich guild had its own stone table, and the costumed guild members met on Sechseläuten for dinner, described by Gottfried Keller in his poem Ein Festzug in Zürich (a procession in Zurich, 1856).

In August 1526, guests from St. Gallen were invited by the city councils and all the Guilds of Zurich for a dinner. The attendees of this dinner included Ulrich Zwingli, the prominent Zurich cleric; Leo Jud; Konrad Pelikan; Friedrich Myconius; and the Kappel abbey's abbot.

The Hedwig Fountain (1688) was sculpted by Gustav Siber. It depicts the legend of the siege of Zurich in 1292 with a helmeted sculpture of the leader of the Zurich women. Under baroque influence, Lindenhof was converted in 1780 to a strictly geometrical park.

In 1851, the Masonic lodge Modestia cum Libertate (M.c.L.) bought the Paradies building in the southeastern corner and converted it into a lodge building with distinctive gables. At this time, coins, stove tiles and other artefacts from the Roman and medieval times were found. 1865, severe storm damage resulted in a redesign: Instead of Lime trees, the park was dominated for some years by chestnut and acacia trees. The redesign was not accepted by the population, and in 1900, Lindenhof Square was given its present appearance.

Today, there are numerous public events and festivals in addition to the historical guild dinner. The Square is also a tourist attraction. Cars are not allowed in the narrow streets to the Lindenhof.

Among the prominent historical visitors are Giacomo Casanova; Johann Wolfgang von Goethe; Johannes von Müller; Herzog Charles Augustus, Grand Duke of Saxe-Weimar-Eisenach; Johann Gottlieb Fichte; Anne Louise Germaine de Staël; Karl Wilhelm Friedrich Schlegel; Johann Ludwig Uhland; Franz Liszt; Richard Wagner and Johannes Brahms.

== Heritage site of national significance ==
The hillside area is listed as a Swiss heritage site of national significance, including the remains of its prehistoric Celtic, Gallo-Roman and medieval settlements and buildings.

== Literature ==
- Mauro Baster, Nicola Behrens et al.: Quartierspiegel Lindenhof. Präsidialdepartement der Stadt Zürich, Statistik Stadt Zürich (Hrsg.), Zürich 2006 (PDF; 2.77 MB). (in German)
- Kunsthistorisches Institut (Hrsg.): Grüne Winkel in der City. Zurich 1997 (in German)
- Andreas Motschi et al.: Eine Mauer kehrt ins Stadtbild zurück: Untersuchung und Sanierung der Lindenhof-Stützmauer. In: Archäologie und Denkmalpflege. Zurich 2003–2006 (in German)
- Walter Baumann: Gang durch Zürich mit Walter Baumann. Band 1: Vom Lindenhof zum Fraumünster. Orell Füssli, Zurich 1987-1993 (in German)
- Jürg Schneider, Jürg Hanser: Fenster in die Vergangenheit: Lindenhof, römische Thermen, St. Peter, Wasserkirche, Haus Zum Rech. In: Zürcher Denkmalpflege. Stadt Zürich, 1985/86 (in German)
