= Sibir =

The name Sibir can refer to:

- Russian for Siberia
- the Khanate of Sibir, after which the region of Siberia is named
- Qashliq, also known as Sibir, historical capital city of Khanate of Sibir
- Siberian Tatars, an ethnic group of South Siberia
- S7 Airlines, a Russian airline based in Novosibirsk, Russia, formerly known as Sibir Airlines
- FC Sibir Novosibirsk, an association football club based in Novosibirsk, Russia
- HC Sibir, ice hockey club based in Novosibirsk, Russia
- Sibir Energy, a Russian company listed on the London Stock Exchange
- Sibir (newspaper), Siberian newspaper

== Icebreakers ==
- Sibir (1937 icebreaker), a Soviet icebreaker launched in 1937 as I. Stalin and later renamed
- Sibir (1977 icebreaker), a Soviet Arktika-class nuclear-powered icebreaker in service from 1977 until 1992
- Sibir (2017 icebreaker), a Russian Project 22220 icebreaker in service since 2022
