= Niederdorf district =

Area in Zürich

The Niederdorf district (lit.: "lower-village district") refers to an area in Zurich's old town across and along the Limmat river from the Zurich Main Station. It is known as being a main destination for the city's nightlife, as well as many shops and alleyways. The Niederdorfstrasse is its main strip.

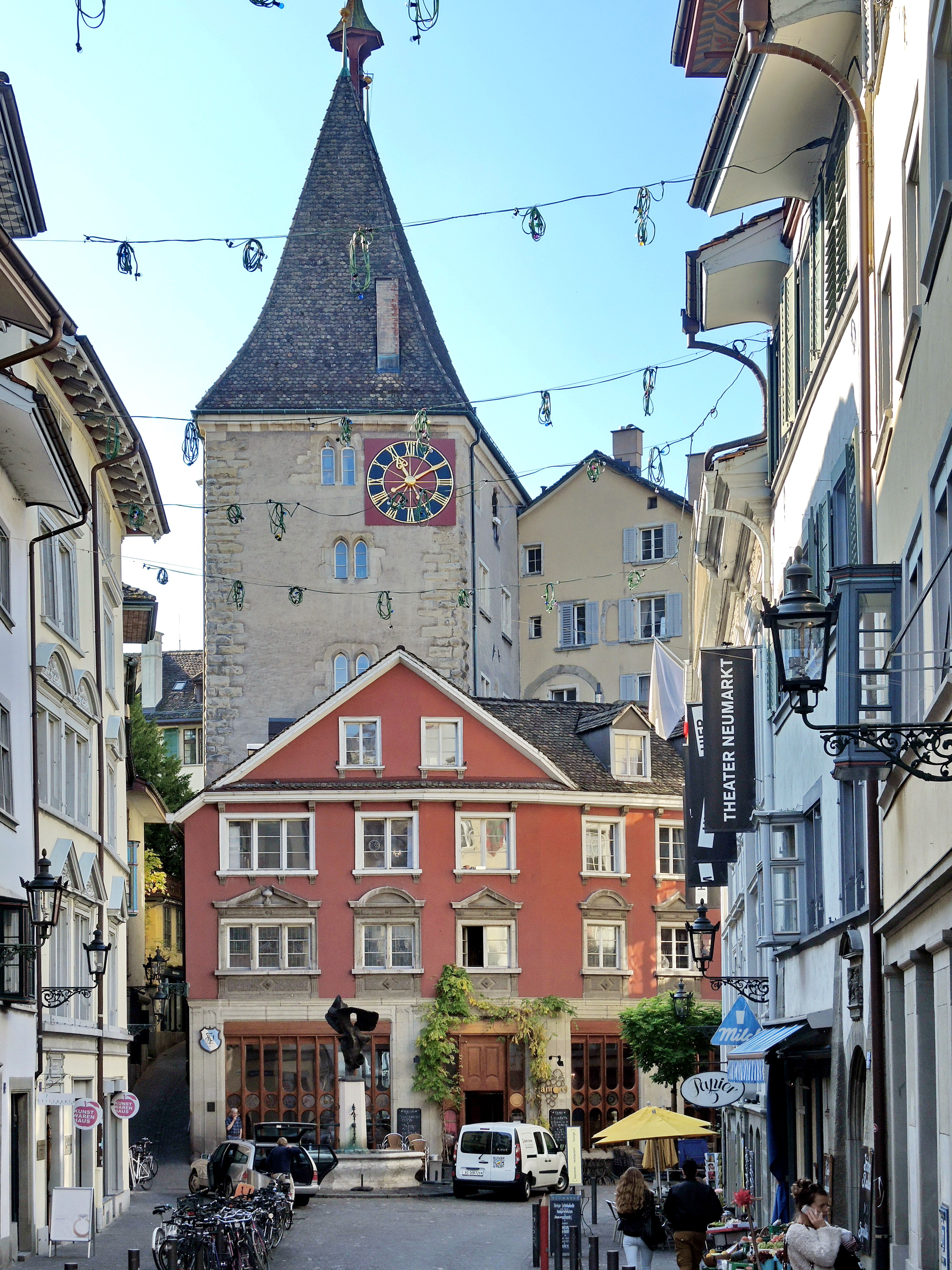
Niederdorf: Neumarkt and Grimmenturm

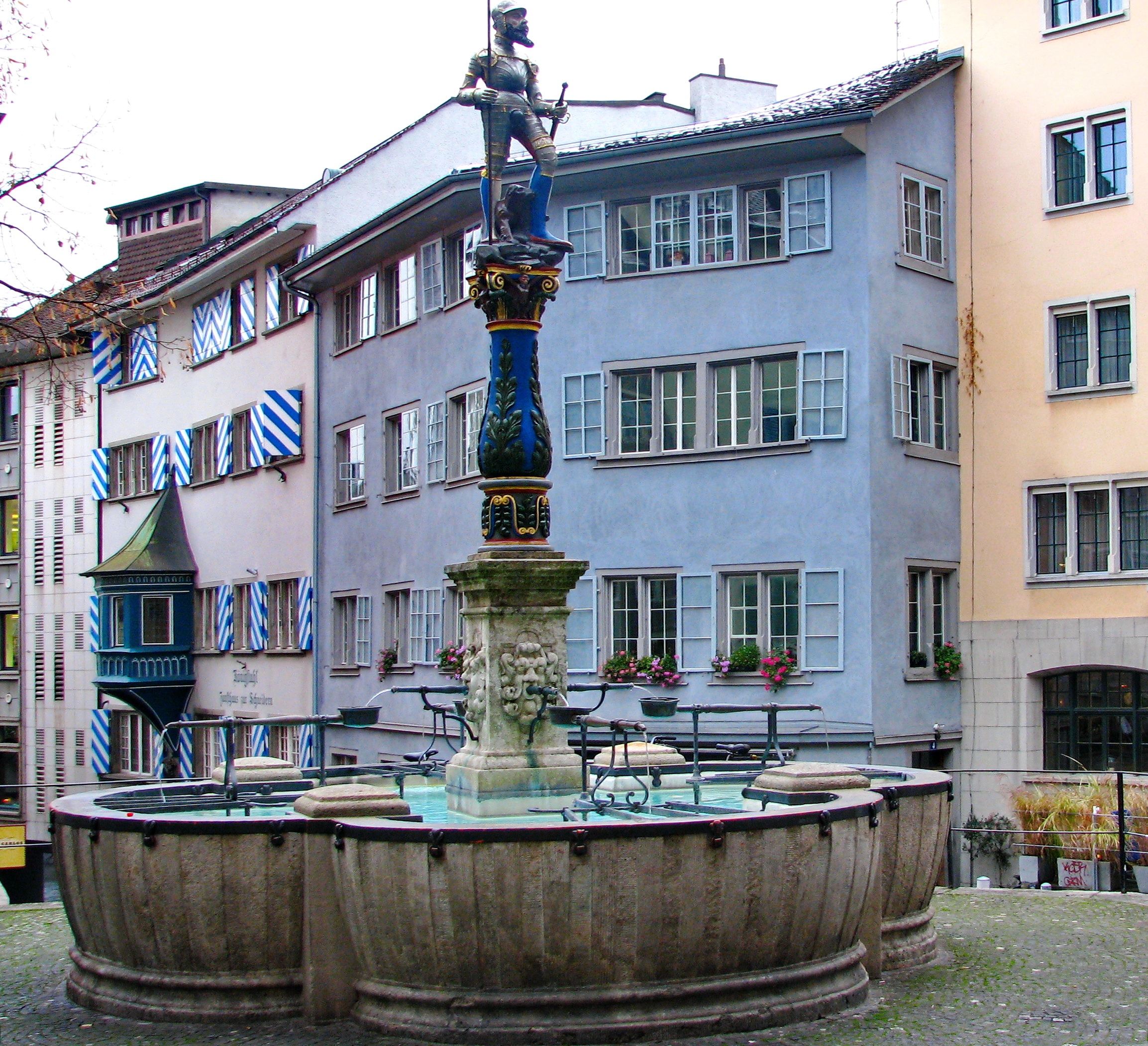
Niederdorf: Stüssihofstatt

The Niederdorf stretches from the Central station to the Stüssihofstatt. It is closely connected to the Oberdorf (lit.: "upper village"), which lies between Rämistrasse and the Niederdorf and is mistakenly considered part of the Niederdorf by many visitors.

There is a tunnel beneath the Marktgasse: an underground passage connecting the two properties at Marktgasse No. 14 (Hotel 'Goldenes Schwert') and No. 17 (formerly Hotel 'Rothus') and was built during renovations in 1952. The tunnel was used for the delivery and exchange of goods between the two properties. Both hotels were owned by the same hotelier at the time. The tunnel was also used by hotel employees and, above all, by the employees and performers of the variety shows housed there. The tunnel still exists today.

The Irish writer James Joyce, who lived and worked in Zurich for a longer period of time, called Zurich’s Niederdorf "Neederthorpe".

== Points of interest ==
In the Niederdorf district are located:

- The Zentralbibliothek Zürich (Zurich Central Library) is the main library of both the city and the University of Zurich, located in the middle of the Niederdorf, at Zähringerplatz 6.

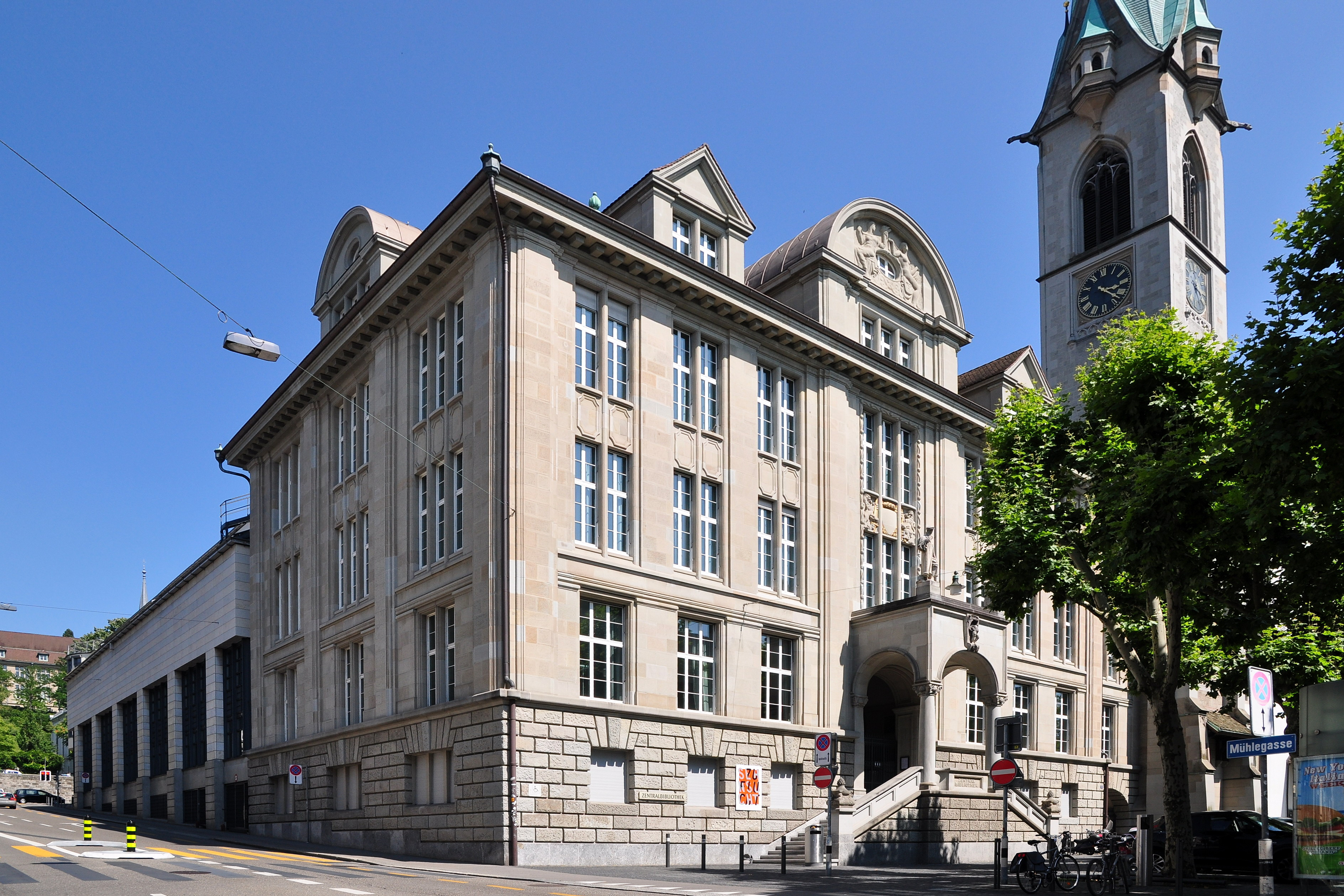
Left: Zentralbibliothek, right: Predigerkirche

- The Predigerkirche is one of the four main churches of the old town of Zurich. The church is located on Zähringerplatz 6, adjacent of the Zentralbibliothek.
- The Polybahn is a historic funicular. The line links the Niederdorf (from Central) with the terrace (Polyterrasse) by the main building of the ETH Zurich.

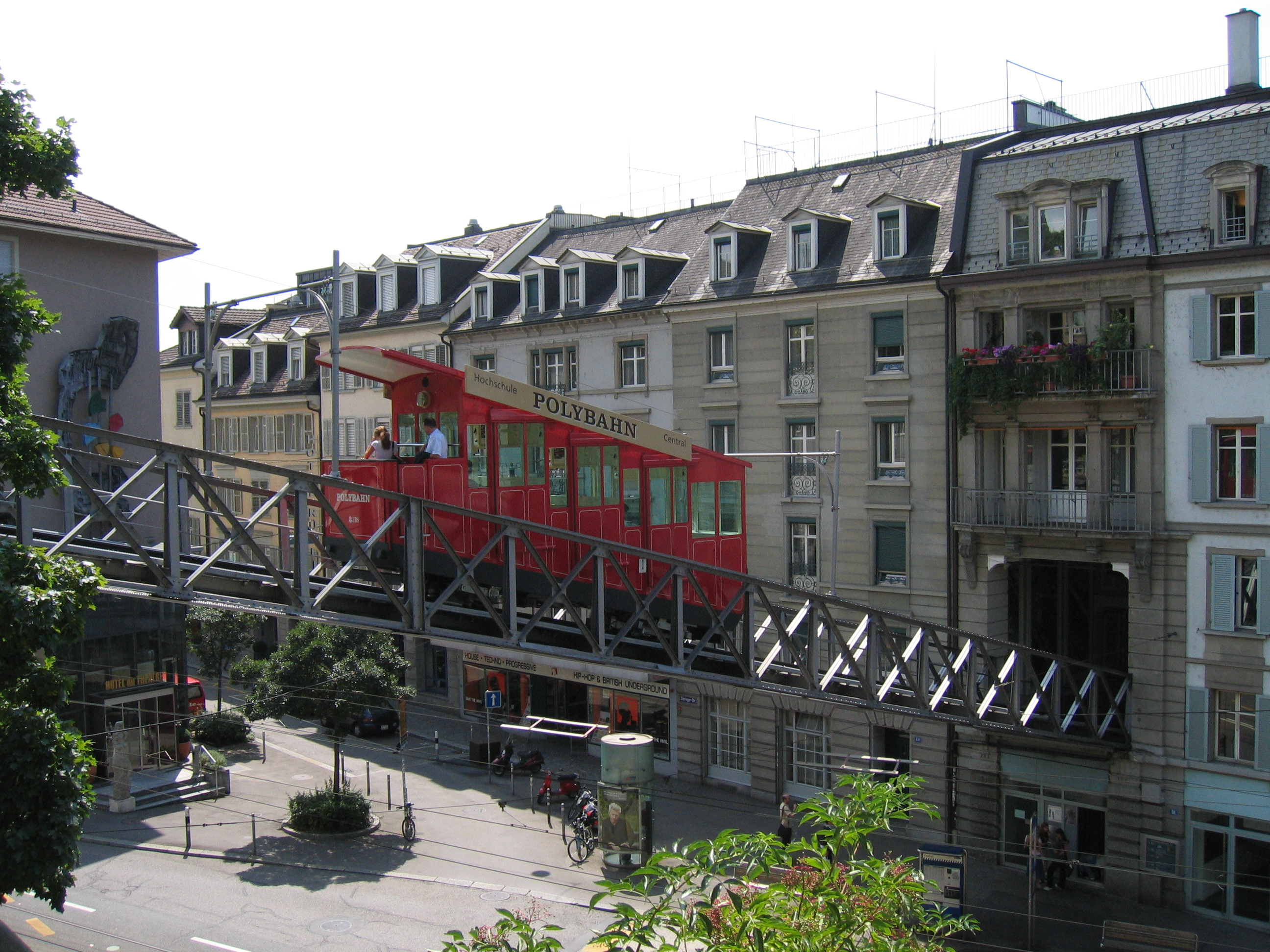
Polybahn (lower station)

- At Münstergasse 23 stands Johann Heinrich Pestalozzi's former residence, where he lived during his studies from 1762 to 1765 and until his move to Kirchberg and Mülligen (inscription on the facade). The house is known as "Zum Roten Gatter". Furthermore, an inscription on the facade states that the then-owner of the house, Chaspar Hess, established Zurich's first postal service here in 1630. Additionally, the facade features murals by the Zurich painter/artist Jakob Gubler (work from 1927).

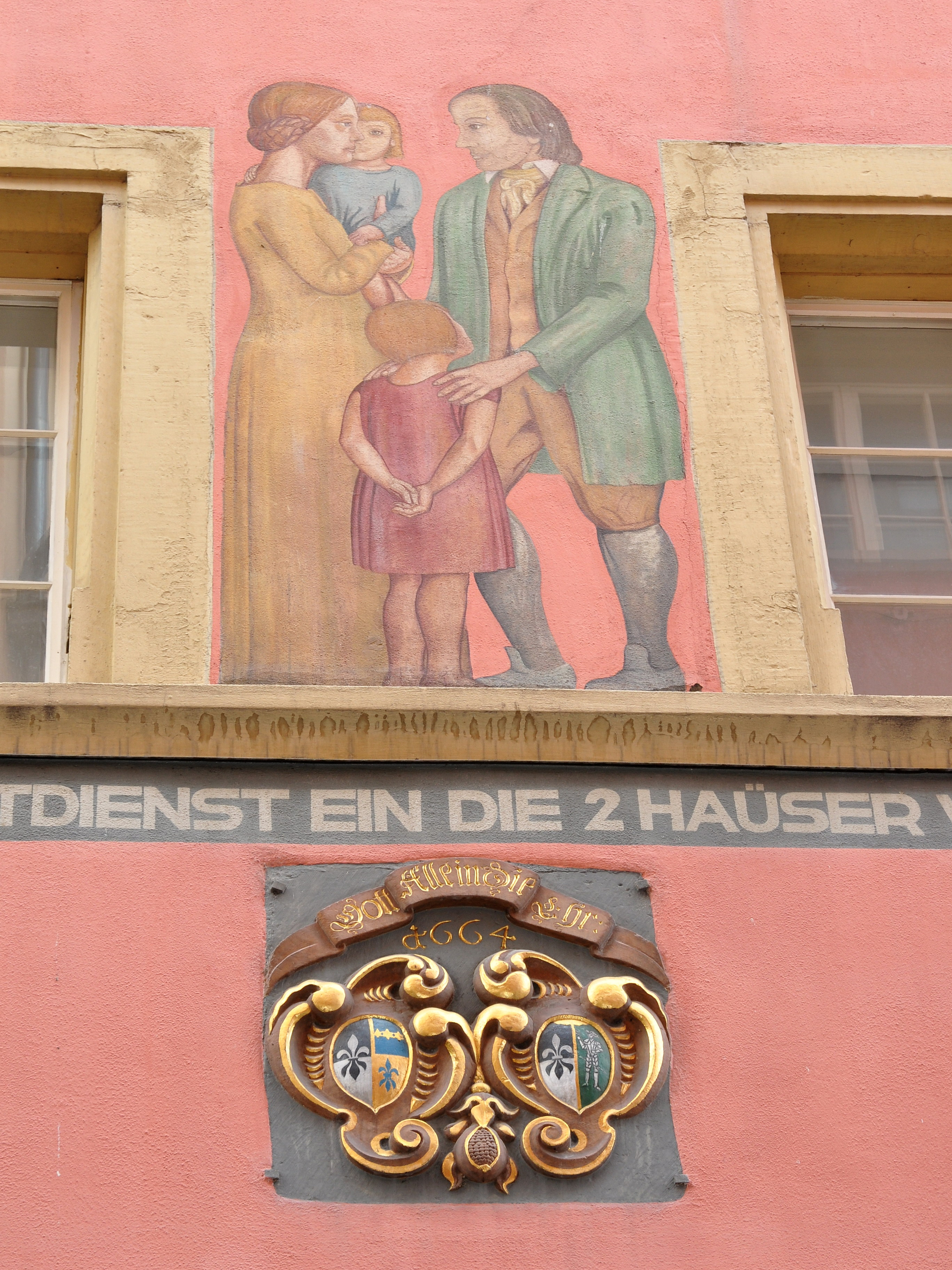
Mural on the house "Zum Roten Gatter"

- Cabaret Voltaire is the birthplace of the Dada art movement (founded in Zurich, Switzerland, in 1916). It is currently operating as a museum, bar and cultural space open to the public, located at Spiegelgasse 1.

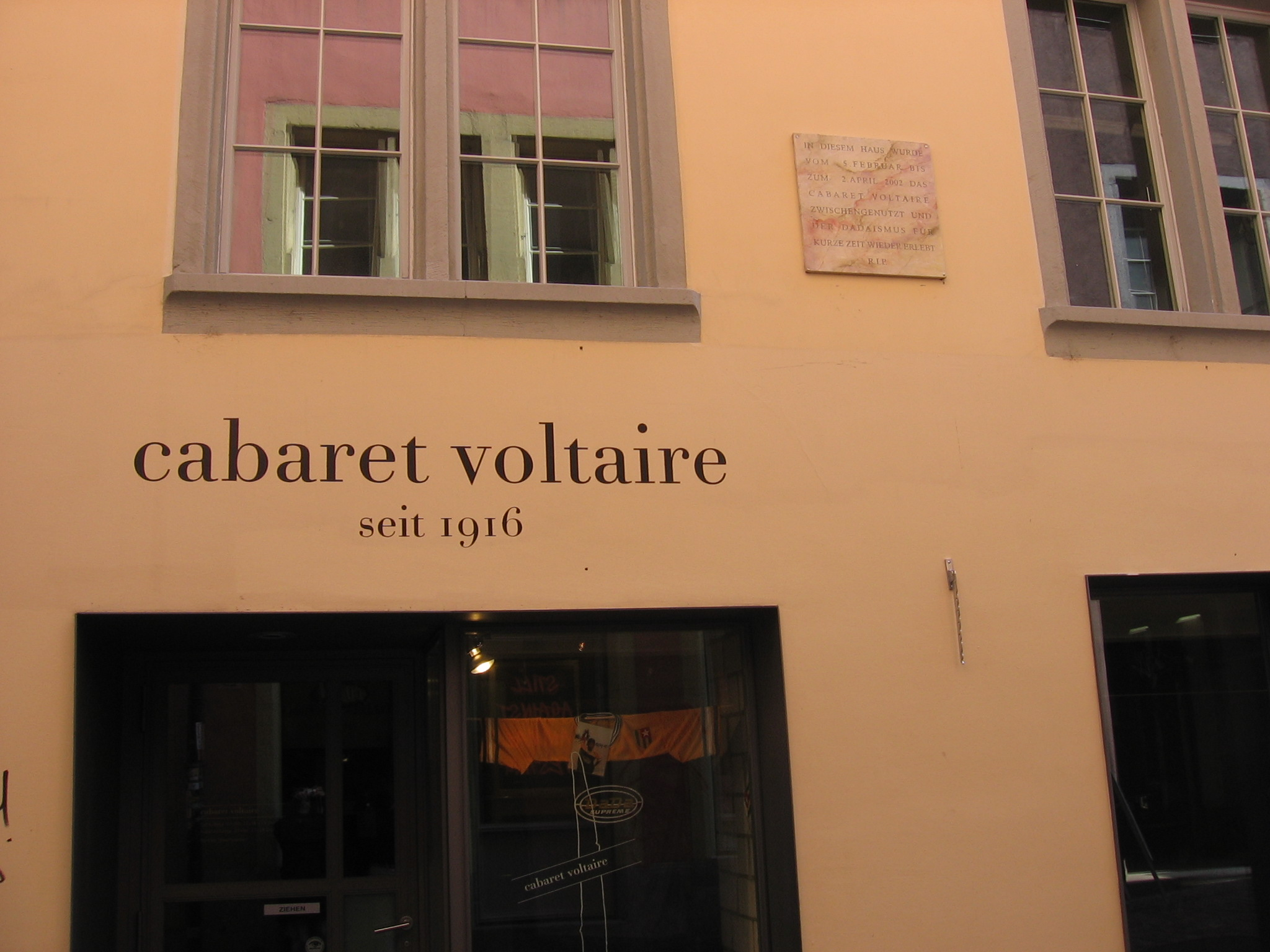
Cabaret Voltaire

- Also at Spiegelgasse, at No. 12, the German writer, dramatist and revolutionary Georg Büchner spent the last months of his life, before dying there of typhus in 1837 at the age of only 23.
- The Swiss writer, poet, painter, and politician Gottfried Keller grew up in the Niederdorf. His former home is located at Rindermarkt 9. He spent his youth in the "Haus zur Sichel", living there (with interruptions) from 1821 to 1848.
- The Russian revolutionary and politician Lenin, who launched the Russian Revolution from here, lived at Spiegelgasse 14 in 1916/1917. A memorial plaque commemorates the former resident.
- Between Froschaugasse 2 and 4, in a small courtyard, a memorial plaque commemorates the Jews in Zurich during the Middle Ages. In the late Middle Ages, most of Zurich's Jews lived on Froschaugasse and the nearby Brunngasse. The building at Froschaugasse 4 once housed their synagogue. In 1999, the city of Zurich therefore renamed a small, previously nameless alleyway running behind this building "Synagogengasse" (passage permitted only at certain times). The Froschaugasse was called "Judengasse" (engl. "Jewish Alley") in the Middle Ages.

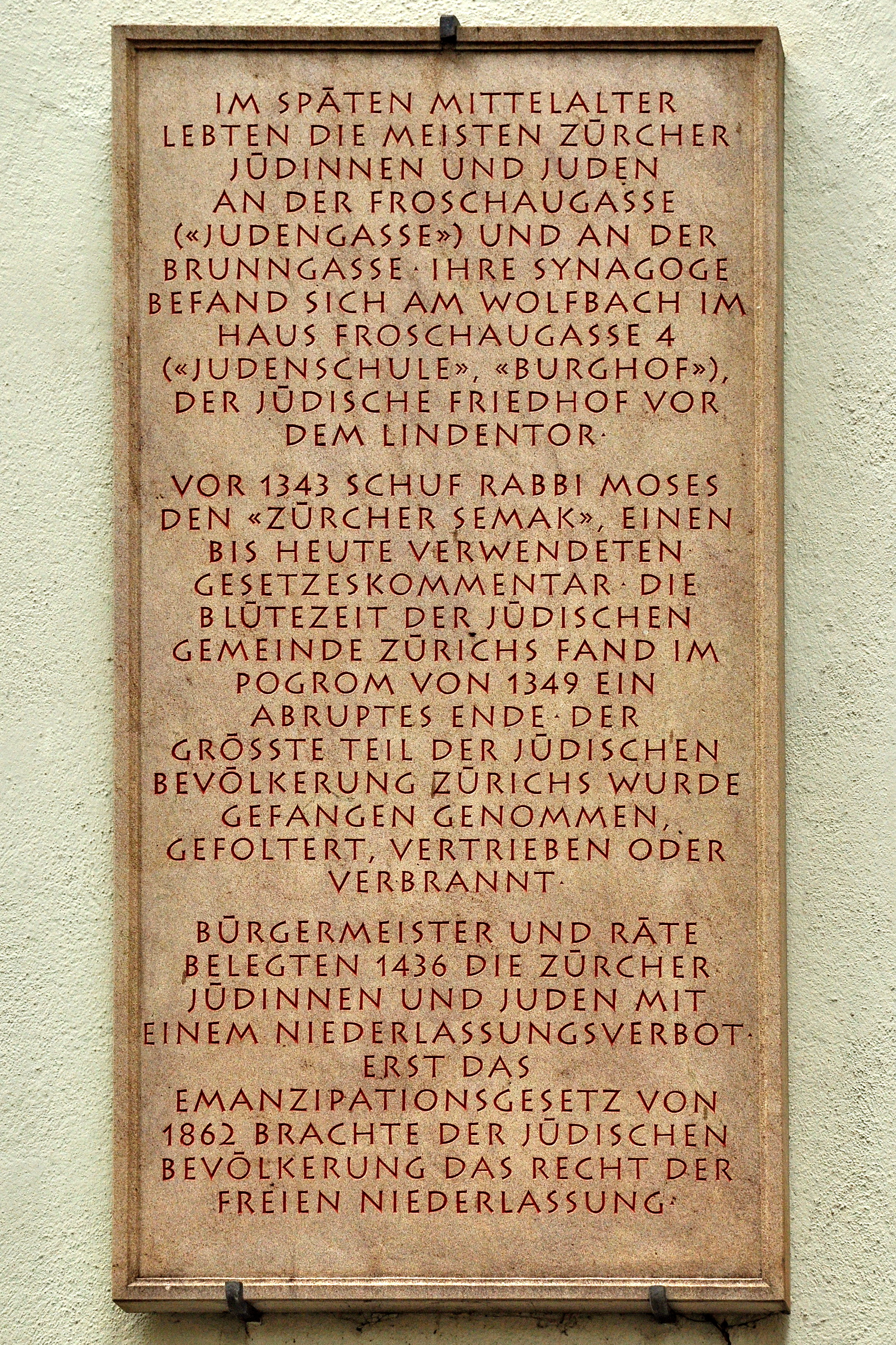
Memorial plaque in the Froschaugasse commemorating the Jews in Zurich during the Middle Ages

- Hotel "Hirschen" on Niederdorfstrasse 13, at the Hirschenplatz: This is the oldest hotel in the Niederdorf; it has existed since the 14th century. The hotel also made music history: most of the songs from the groundbreaking album Paranoid by the British heavy metal band Black Sabbath were evolved in the then 'Beat Club' (also called the Hirschen Club) on the ground floor of the Hotel Hirschen in the fall of 1969, during the band's concert series. A plaque at the Hotel Hirschen commemorates this. Pink Floyd, The Lords, The Kinks, and other bands have also performed live at the Hirschen. The Dadaist manifesto by Hugo Ball and his fellow artists was also written in the Hotel Hirschen in 1916.

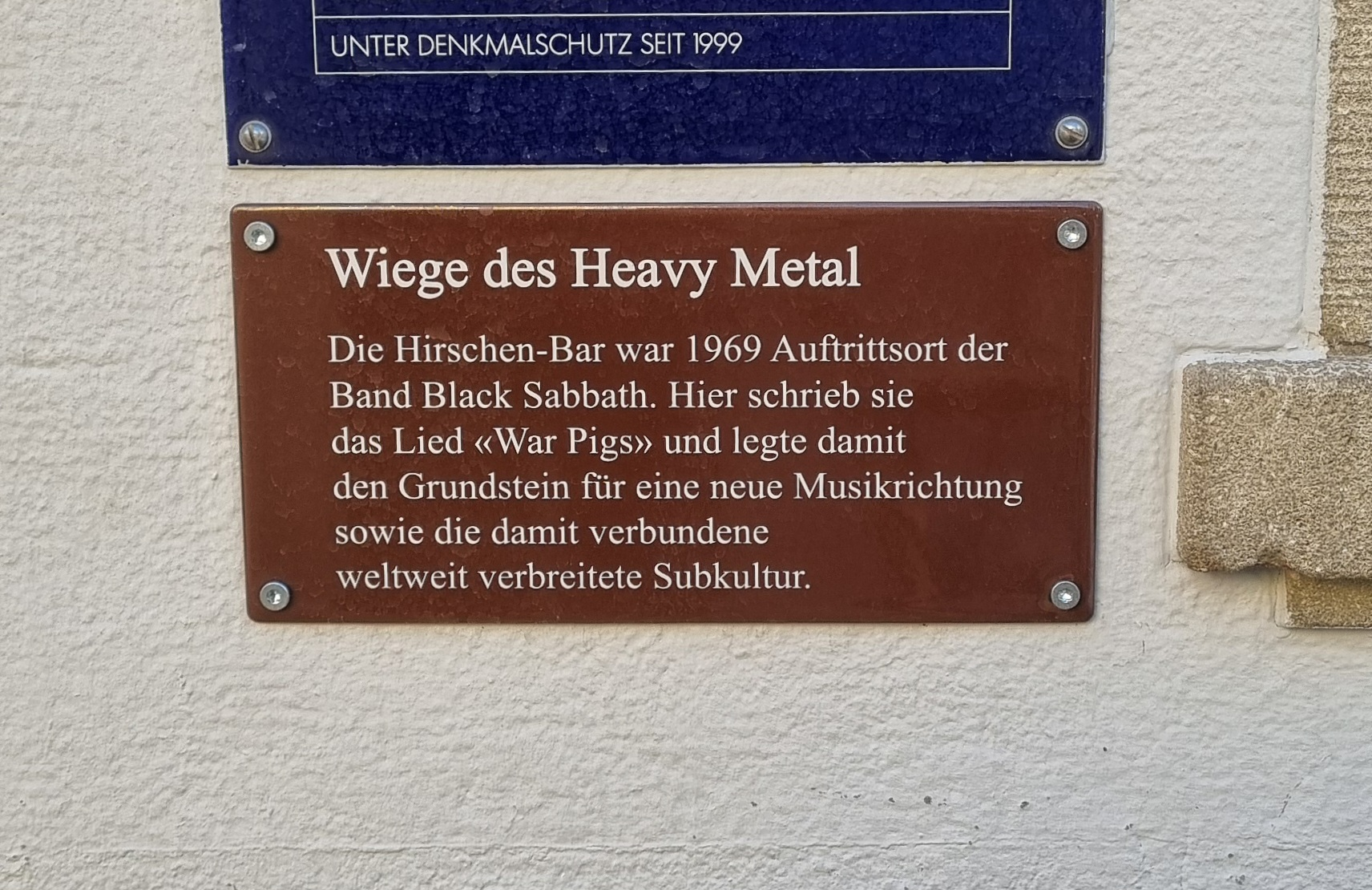
Black Sabbath plaque on the Hotel Hirschen, at Hirschenplatz

- The oldest pub in Zurich, the «Oliver Twist», is located in the Niederdorf district. It has existed since 1970 and is situated at Rindermarkt 6.
