= Fountains of Barcelona =

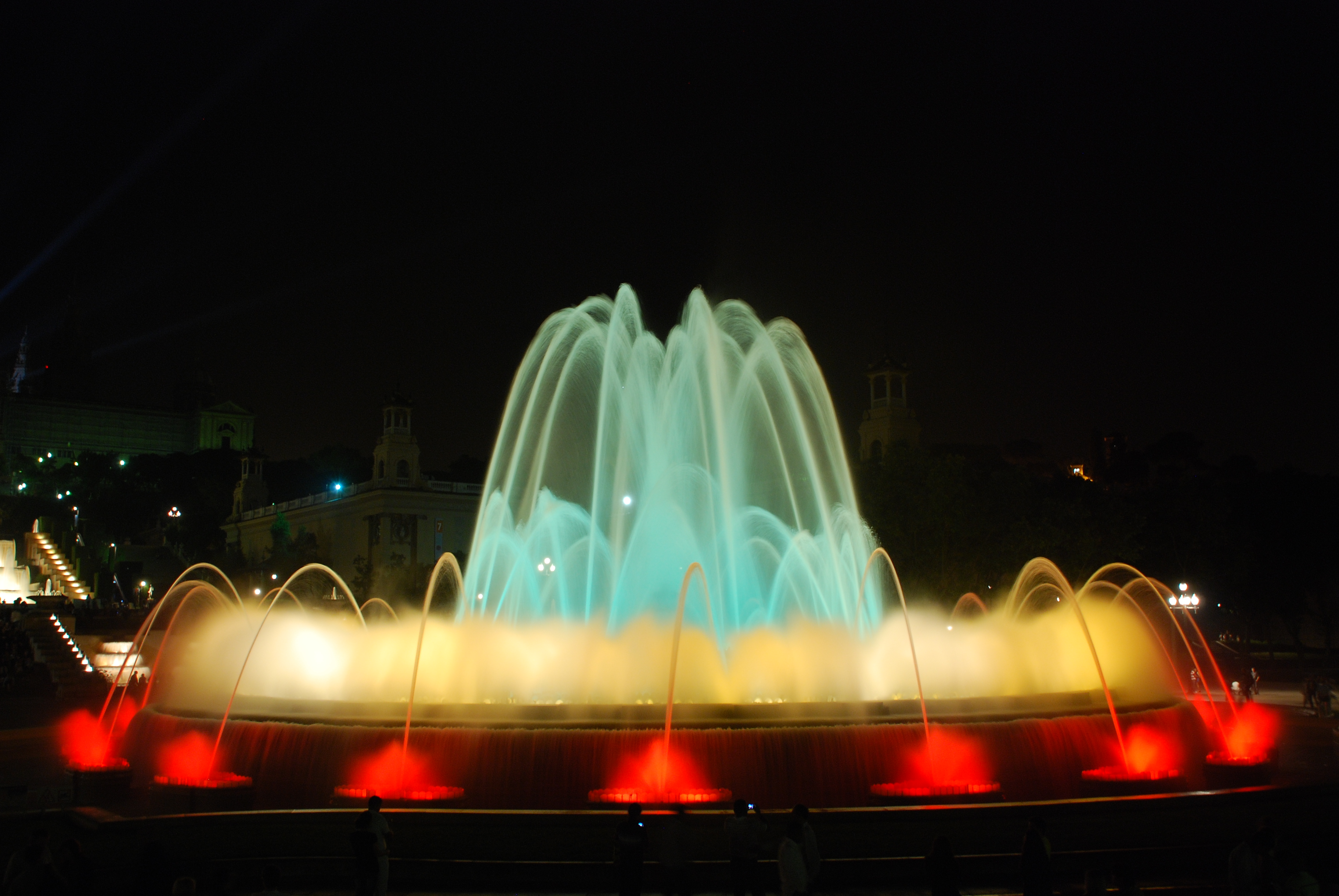
The Magic Fountain of Montjuïc, in the Carles Buïgas Square, Barcelona.

The fountains of Barcelona, Spain, are a group of various jets of water that are utilized for the public benefit, or as ornamental elements to preexisting fountains, lakes, rivers, waterfalls, or diverse architectural installation. They can vary from the simplest pipe of water or the traditional symmetrical fountain, to complex arrays of founts decorated with sculptures or other ornamental elements. These fountains, as well as the various sculptures across the city, constitute an excellent example of the public art of Barcelona, which has so defined the City Condal. Many of the city's fountains add to its functional character an ornamental facet that, like the rest of its municipal art, has varied over time according to the artistic tendencies of the times, and has left the Catalan capital a collection of works admired greatly both by the citizens and by visitors. In Barcelona, there are some 1,800 public fountains, among which there are 670 that produce drinkable water, and 200 that are chiefly considered ornamental. It equates to 18 fountains per square kilometre (km^{2}). Zurich, Switzerland, is second, with 11 fountains per (km^{2}). Paris is third (10 per km^{2}).

In the past, the fountains were installed in squares or central places in the villages chiefly to furnish a supply of water for the population. Upon the establishment of a source for this basic need, the water source became a location of public gathering for social exchange. Thereafter, these places increasingly gained importance and ornamentation, and city boys eventually turning into the monuments that they are today.

== List of fountains ==
- Font de Canaletes
- Magic Fountain of Montjuïc

== See also ==
- Parks and gardens of Barcelona
- Street furniture in Barcelona
- Urban planning of Barcelona
- Fountains of Zurich
