= Public art in Barcelona =

Outdoor monuments and sculptures in Spain

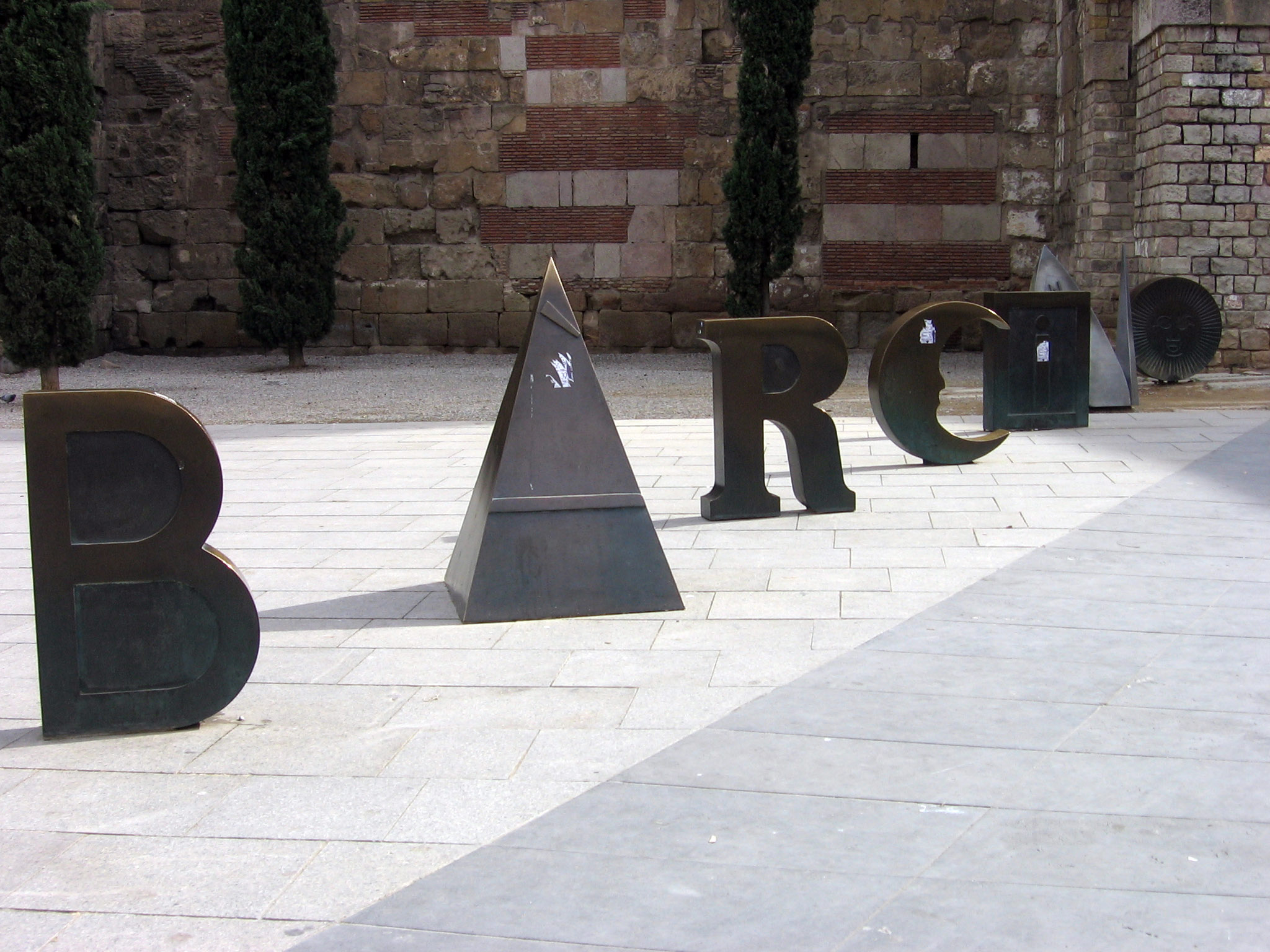
Poema visual Bàrcino (1994) by Joan Brossa in the Plaça Nova

Public art in Barcelona consists of a designated group of monuments and outdoor sculptures in the city. Artworks exist within the architecture, as well as within the network of museums, parks, and gardens, all of which lend an artistic taste to the Catalan capital. There, public art flourished in the 19th century, although the first municipal commission was the 1673 monument to Saint Eulalia in Pedró Square.

Artworks are typically located in niches or on the façades of public buildings. Their density of appearance is usually very high, due to the city's limited space behind the enclosure of medieval defensive walls. Consequently, the walls' demolition in the 19th century sparked a boom the creation of public works, such as Ildefons Cerdà's Eixample project.

The city annexed several municipalities in the early 20th century, increasing the space available for public art. Some were commissioned for particular events such as the 1888 and 1929 Expositions, the 1992 Summer Olympics and the 2004 Universal Forum of Cultures.

== Overview ==
Public art in Barcelona is regulated by the city council and protected by Law 9/1993 of Catalan Cultural Heritage, which guarantees the protection, conservation and research of cultural heritage at several levels.

Urban planning includes architecture, engineering, gardening, industrial arts and sculpture. Urbanism relates to politics, economics, history, geography and sociology.

Monuments are generally located in parks and gardens, squares and intersections, or near public buildings. There are several types; until the 19th century the most common were the column, the triumphal arch and the equestrian statue, three types of monuments inherited from Roman art. Later monuments were busts placed in niches, medallions, fountains, steles and pedestals, friezes, reliefs, commemorative plaques, gravestones, followed by installations, land art and multidisciplinary works. Commonly-used materials include wood, plaster, terracotta and other ceramics, stone, marble, bronze, iron, steel, concrete and aluminium.

Themes include homage to a character or event: religious, mythological, symbolic, allegorical, historical, political, military, scientific or artistic. Public artworks commemorate many aspects of the history of Barcelona.

Types of monuments

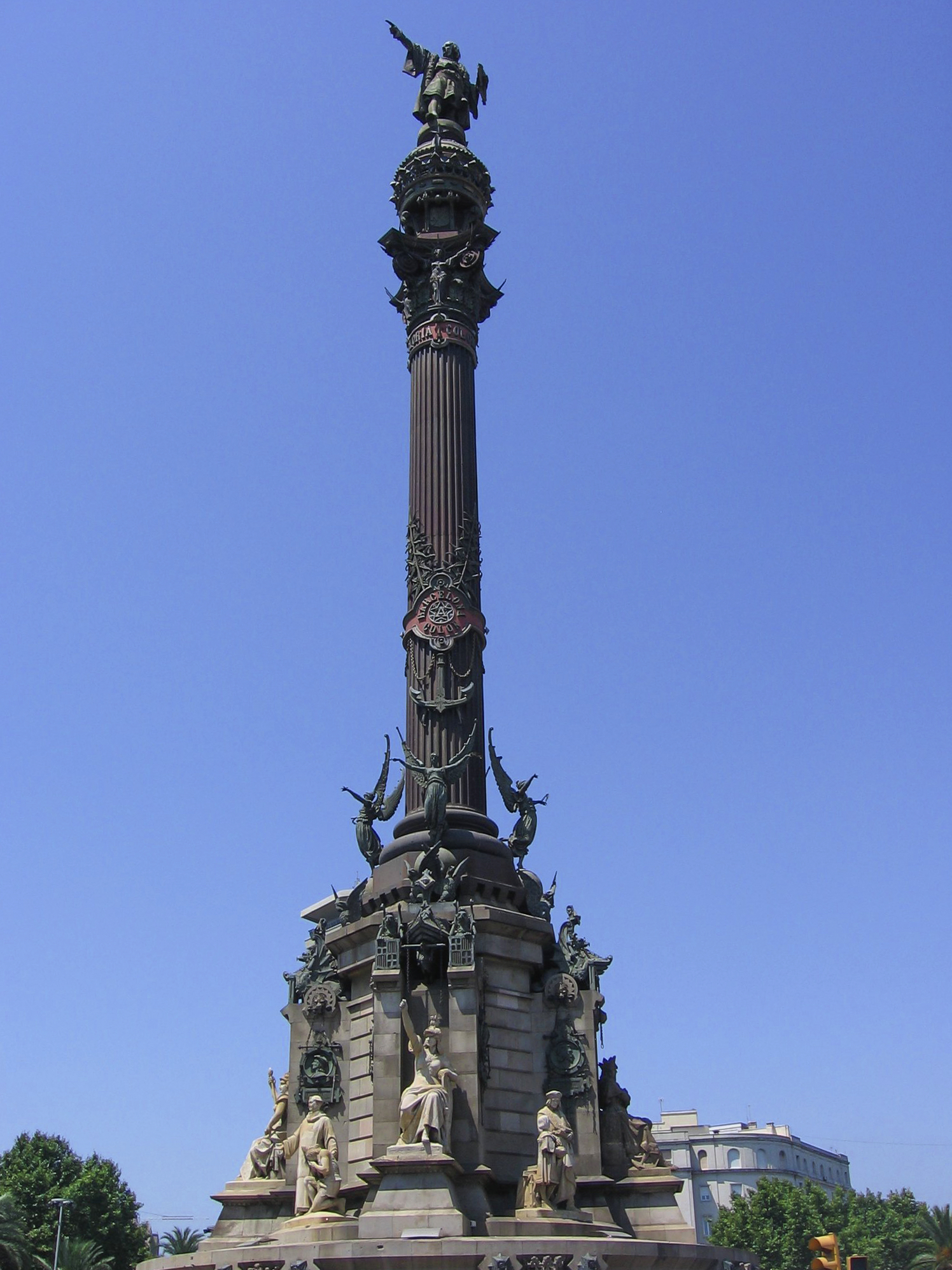
The 1888 Columbus Monument at the Pla del Portal de la Pau is an iconic Barcelona monument

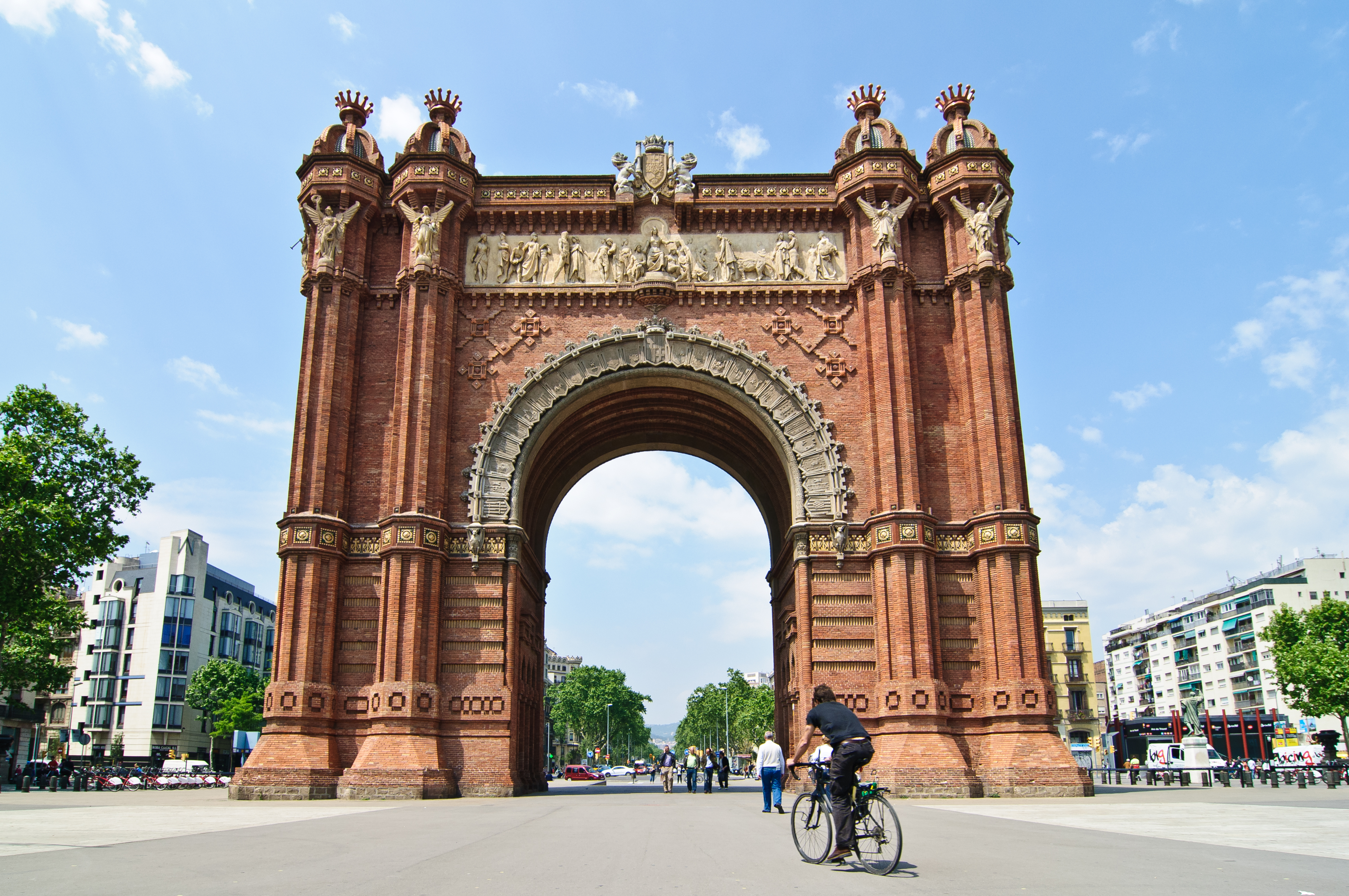
Arc de Triomf (1888) on the Passeig de Lluís Companys

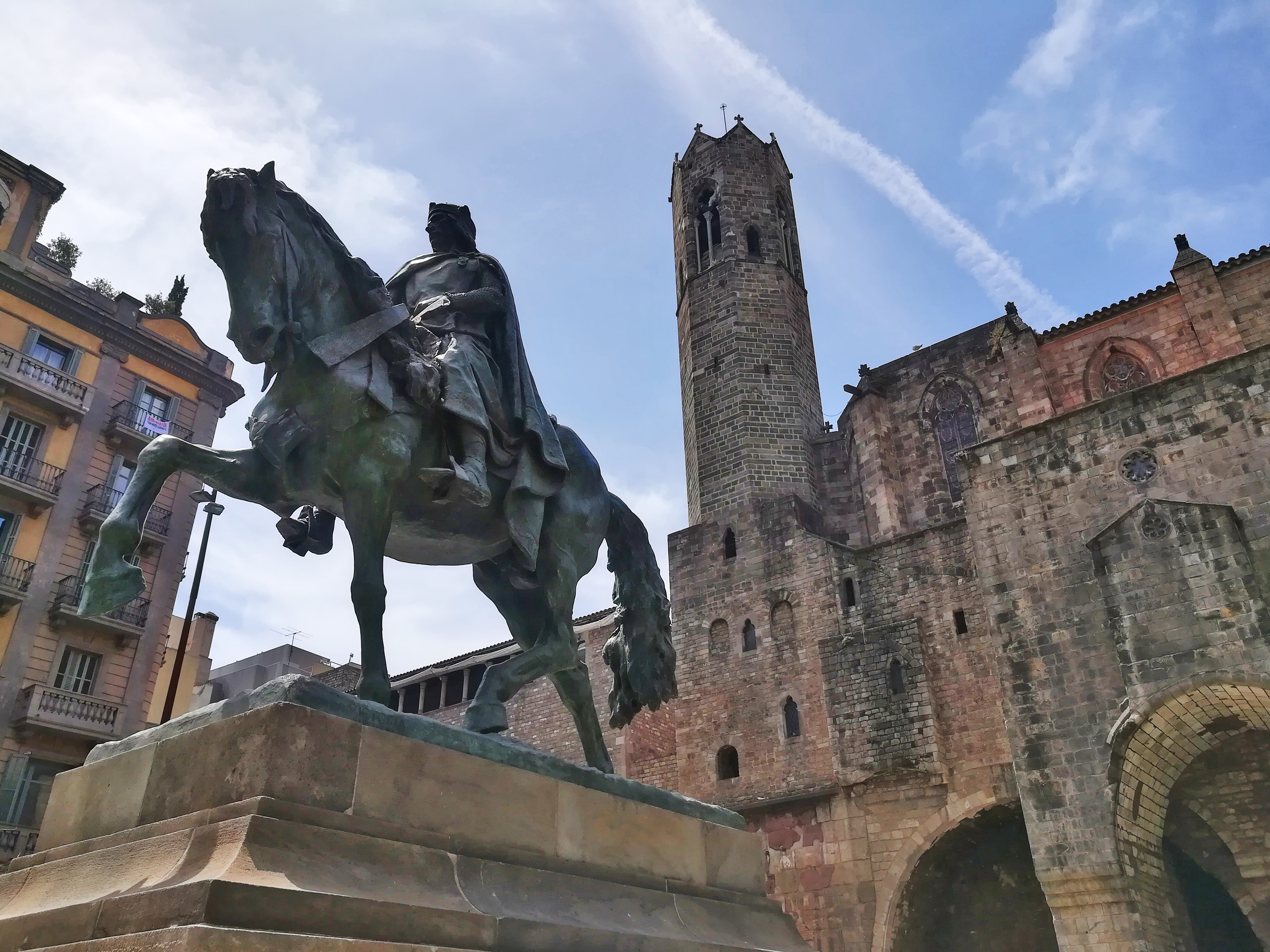
Josep Llimona's equestrian statue of Ramon Berenguer III (1888) on Via Laietana

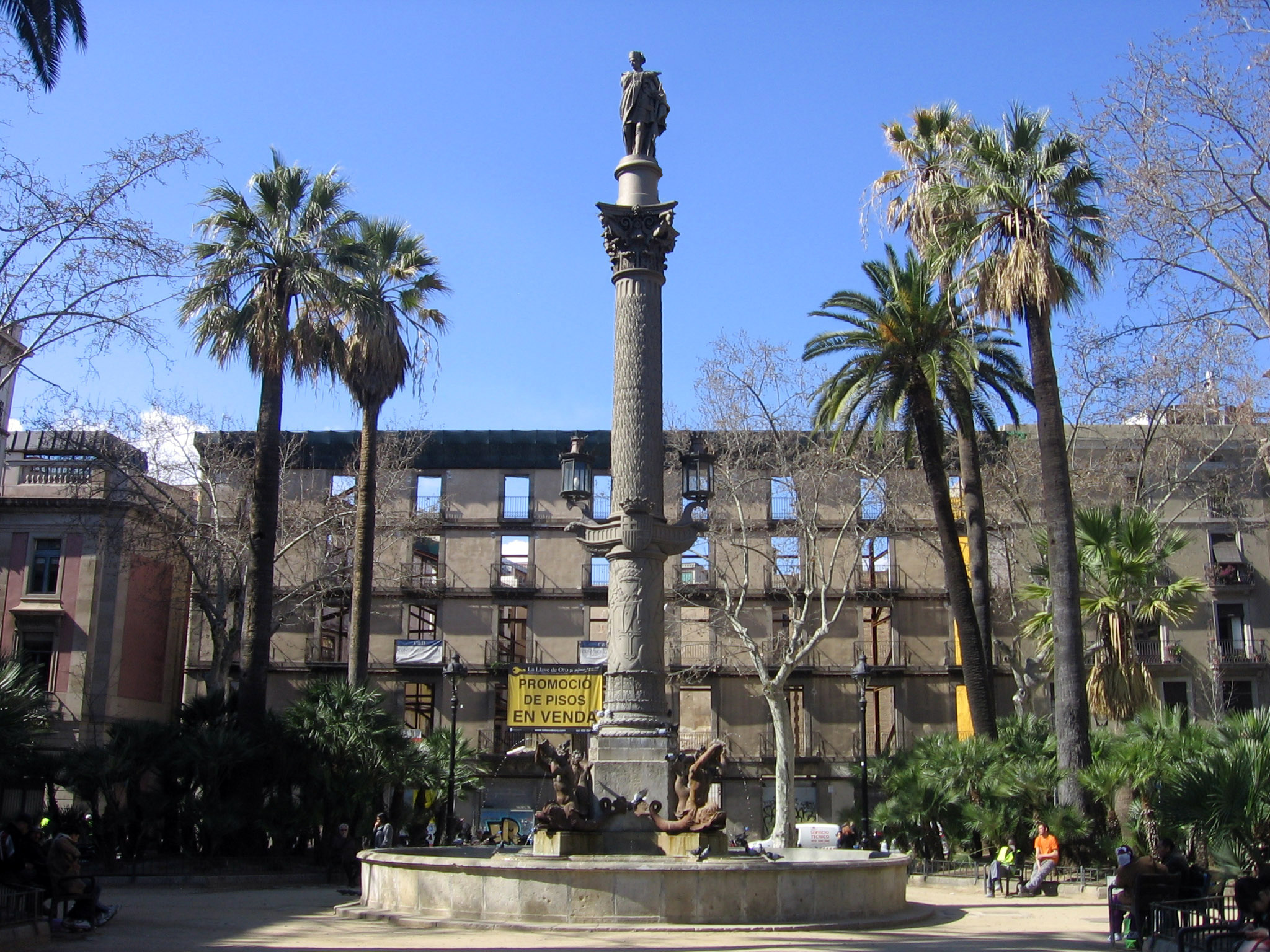
Galceran Marquet column (1851) in Plaça del Duc de Medinaceli

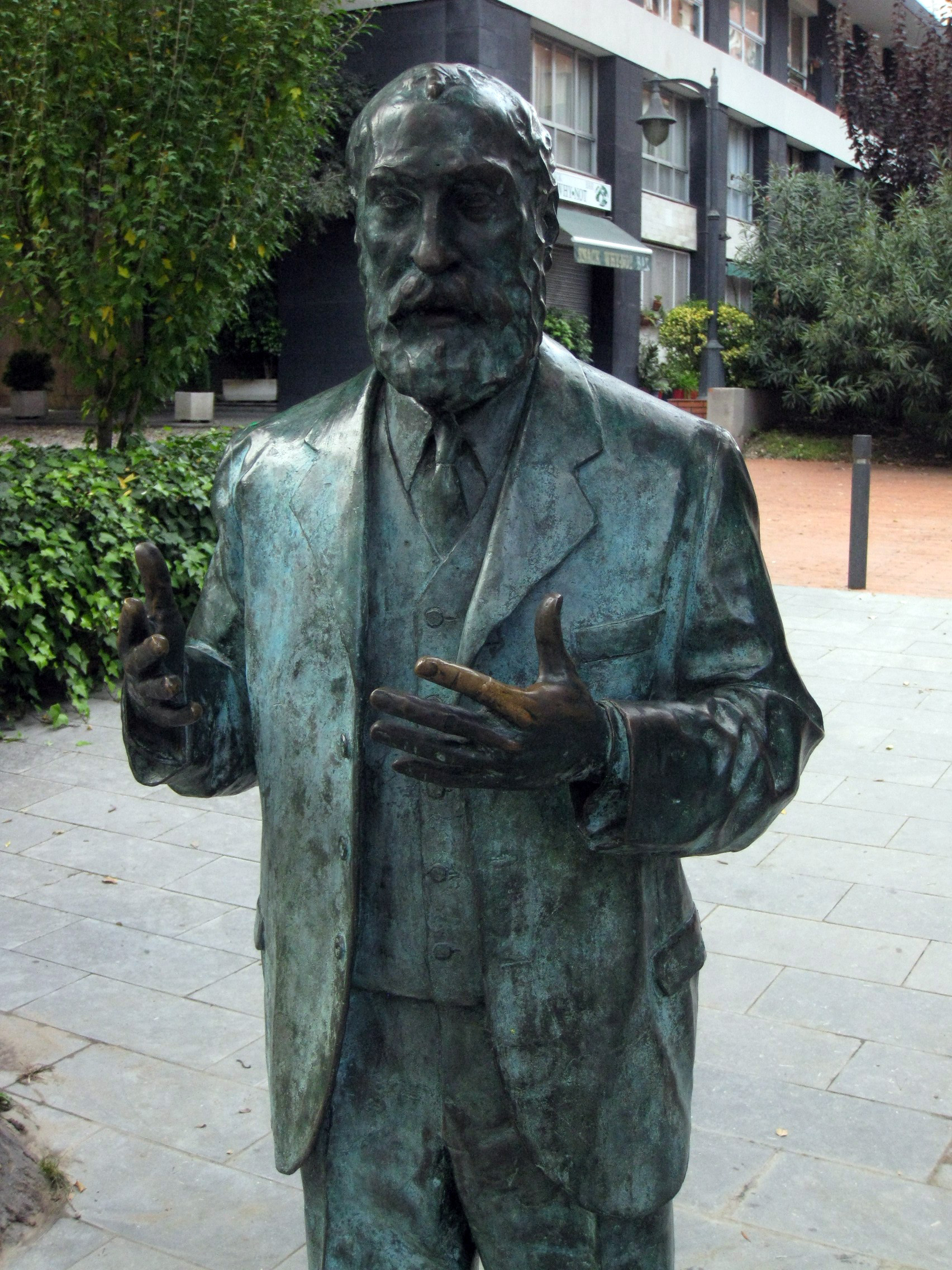
Statue of Antoni Gaudí (1999) by Joaquim Camps in Passeig de Manuel Girona

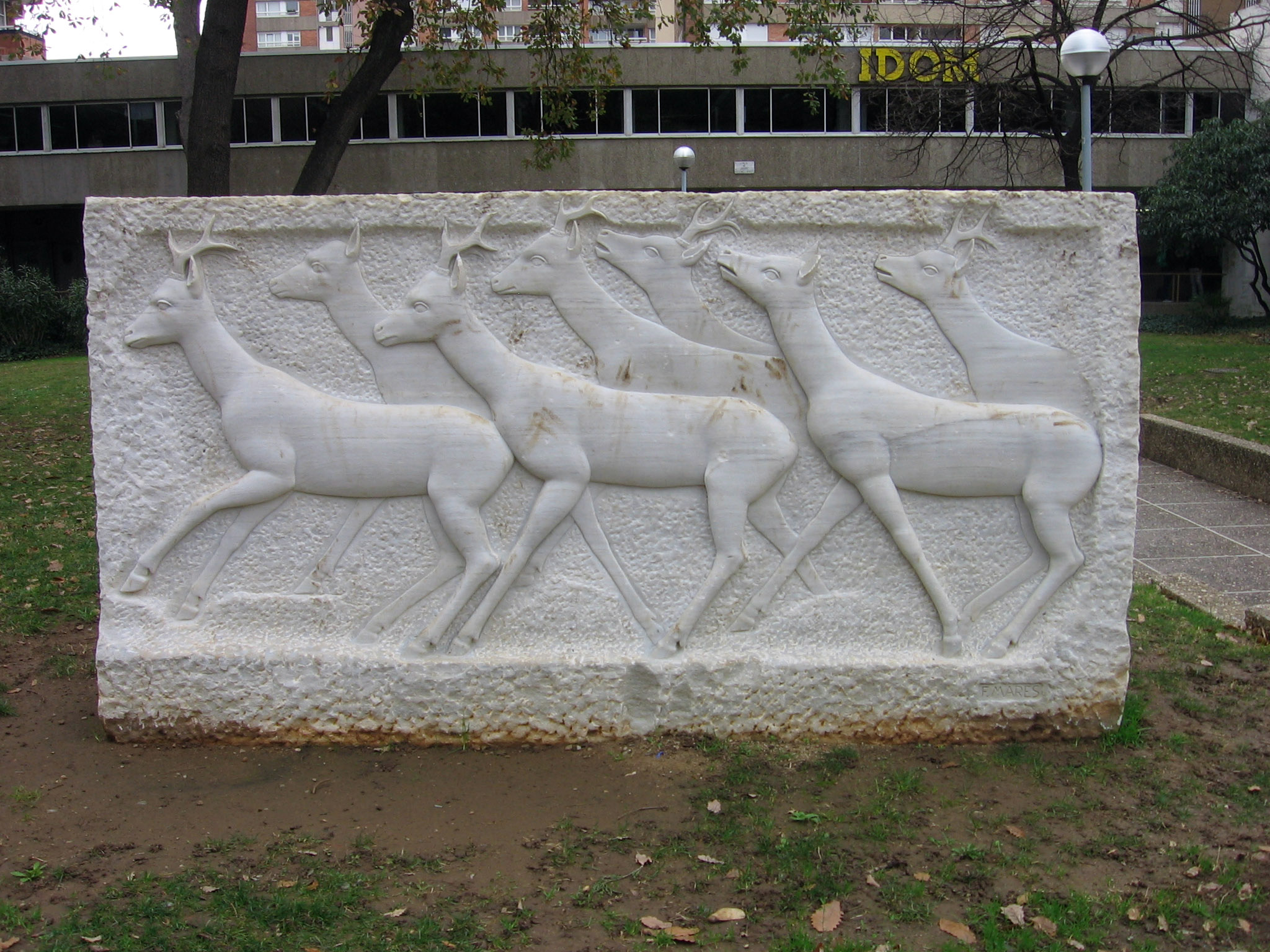
Relief of deer by Frederic Marès (1967) in the Gardens Jaume Vicens Vives

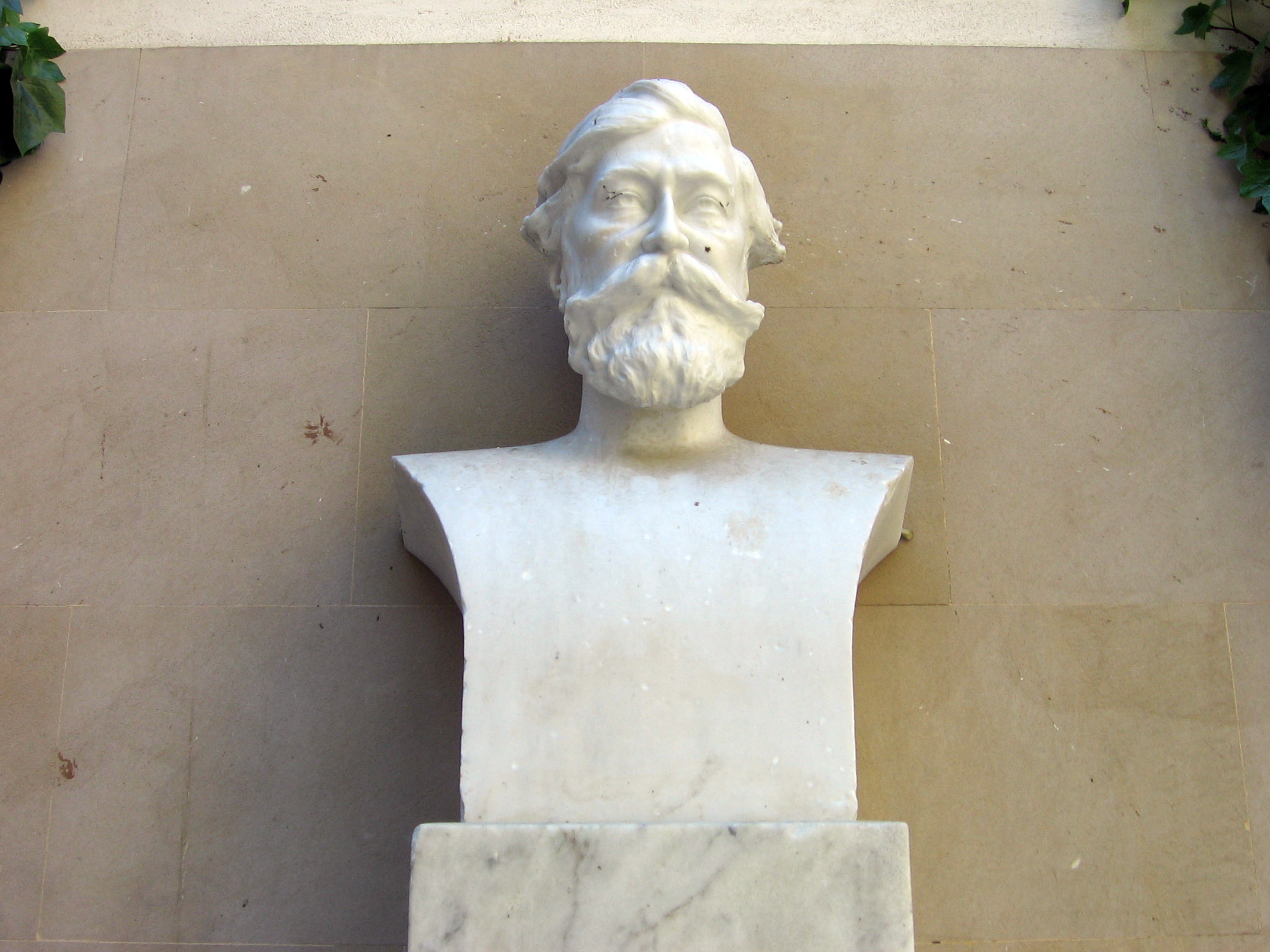
Bust of Santiago Rusiñol (1935) by Enric Clarasó

== History ==
=== Middle Ages ===
Barcelona's first public artworks were created during the Middle Ages, when the city was part of the Crown of Aragon and an important commercial Mediterranean port. The 13th-century Council of One Hundred was one of Barcelona's first public institutions. The city was growing beyond its core – the present-day Gothic Quarter. The El Raval neighbourhood was developed during the 14th century when Barcelona's population was about 25,000.

At that time the city had fountains, and the Gothic city hall had sculptures in front dating to about 1400. In front stands a stone statue of the archangel Raphael. At either side were statues of St. Severus (bishop of Barcelona) and Saint Eulalia of Barcelona.

=== Early modern era ===
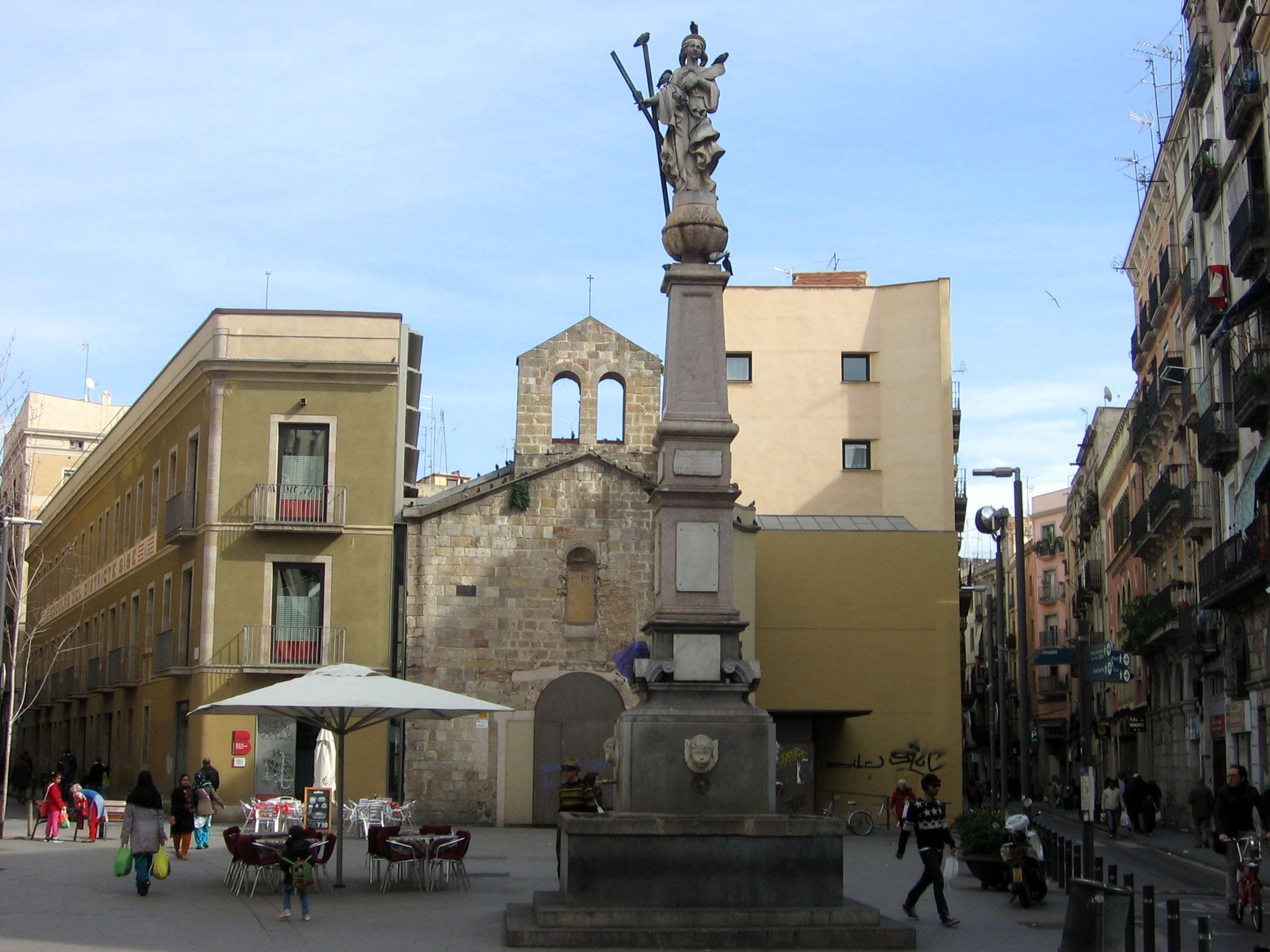
1673 monument to Saint Eulalia, the city's oldest

During the Renaissance, Barcelona became part of the Monarchy of Spain that emerged from the union of Castile and Aragon. It was a period of economic and cultural decline, marked by social conflicts and fighting in the Reapers' War and the War of the Spanish Succession. Barcelona was still a walled city of almost 100,000 then, with its only expansion to the coastal district of La Barceloneta. Its architecture featured Renaissance and Baroque palaces and churches.

Barcelona's artworks were primarily fountains and statues in public buildings until the end of the seventeenth century, when a monument to Saint Eulalia was erected. A cross on a Solomonic column by Bernat Vilar in the courtyard of the Hospital of the Holy Cross was destroyed in 1691 and rebuilt in 1939. In the same courtyard are statues of Saint Roch and Caridad dating to the late 1630s. In the courtyard of the hospital's convalescent home is a 1679 statue of Saint Paul by Louis Bonifaç the Elder, and on Calle del Carmen a statue of Paul from 1668 by Dominic Rovira.

Other works were commissioned by guilds; St. John the Baptist (1628), in the Square of Assaonadors Marcús, was sponsored by the tanners' guild and rebuilt in 1958 by Josep Miret. A 1763 statue of Our Lady of the Angels is on Via Laietana.

The oldest public monument in its original location is the Font de Santa Eulàlia, dedicated to the patron saint of the city, which was erected in Plaça del Pedró in 1673. It was made by master builder Pares Benedict with a wooden statue of the saint by Josep Darder, which in 1685 was replaced by a marble statue by Tramulles Lazarus and Lluís Bonifaç i Massó. In 1826, the base of the monument was converted into a fountain by Josep Mas i Vila. The monument was destroyed in 1936 at the start of the Civil War fighting, but was rebuilt in 1951 with a new design by Frederic Marès i Deulovol. The head of the saint survived and is preserved at the Museum of the History of Barcelona. The base of the monument is square with water spouts, and supports an obelisk topped by a statue of Santa Eulalia

A monument in Santa Eulalia had previously been erected in the Plaza del Blat, now Àngel. It was designed and drawn up in 1618 by Rafael Plansó and consisted of an obelisk on which stood an angel, pointing to the place where an angel had appeared to the delegation that transferred the remains of the saint to the Cathedral Barcelona. The figure of the angel was made by silversmith Felip Ros. In 1821, the obelisk was removed because it impeded traffic movement and was placed in a niche. In 1966, it was replaced by a copy and moved to the Barcelona City history museum.

In 1784, he built the Fountain of Neptune, by Joan Enrich promoted by the count of Assault, next to the Customs, the location of the current station in France. It represented Neptune standing on a pedestal with dolphins and bas-reliefs, amid a cup of water. The statue was destroyed in the popular uprising of Camància (1843) and replaced by a copy made by a stonemason, until 1877 the fountain was dismantled; even retained bas-relief of the pedestal, which is in the Museum of History of Barcelona.

In the late eighteenth century, was founded on the estate of the Marquis de Llupià located in the municipality of Horta de Sant Joan -today a district of the city-garden that despite being passed from private to public property later. Now known as Horta Labyrinth Park, it has profuse sculptural decoration despite its unknown artist and is an interesting example of neoclassical art. The garden highlights the labyrinth that gives the park its name, at the center of which is a statue of Eros, while in the entrance there is a relief of Ariadne and Theseus, at the exit is the echo grotto and Narcissus; at a higher level is the Belvedere viewpoint and two temples in the Italian style with statues of Artemis and Danae; Finally, on a third terrace stands the pavilion of Charles IV, crowned by a sculpture depicting Apollo and the muses, while to the rear is a large lake fed by the source of the nymph Egeria, inspired by the Stowe cave.

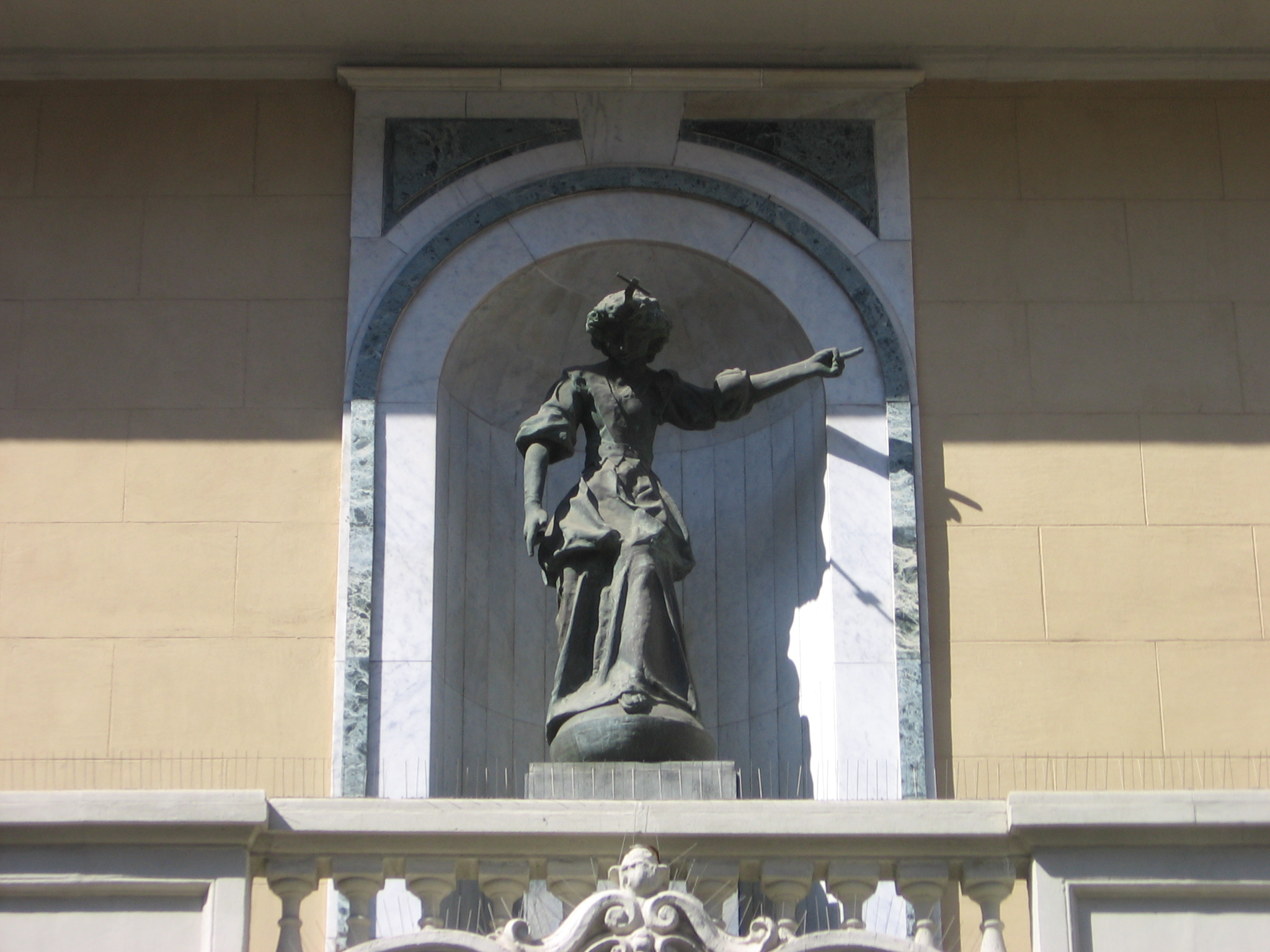
Àngel (1618), by Felip Ros, Plaça de l'Àngel.

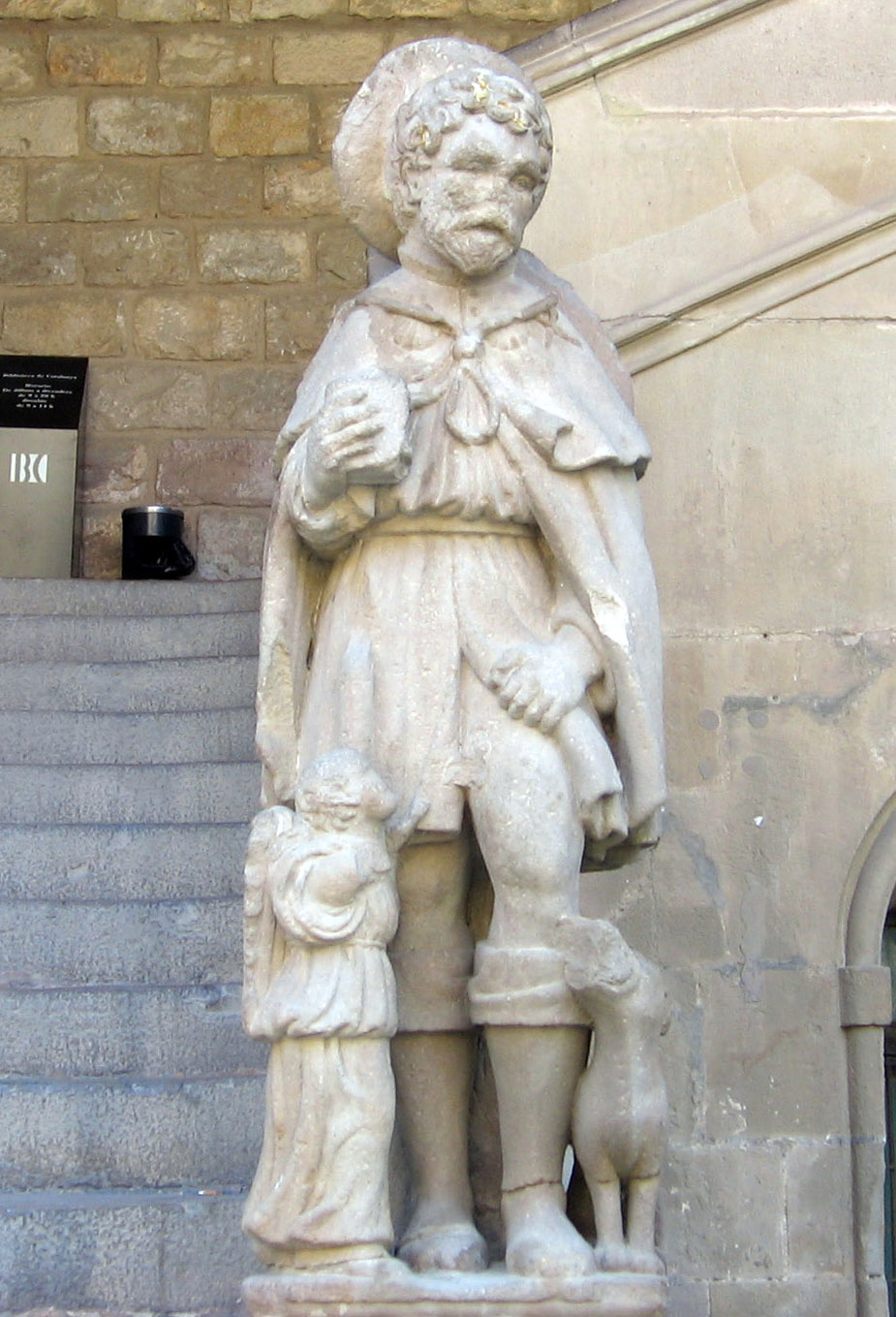
Hospital de la Santa Creu: Sant Roc (1638).

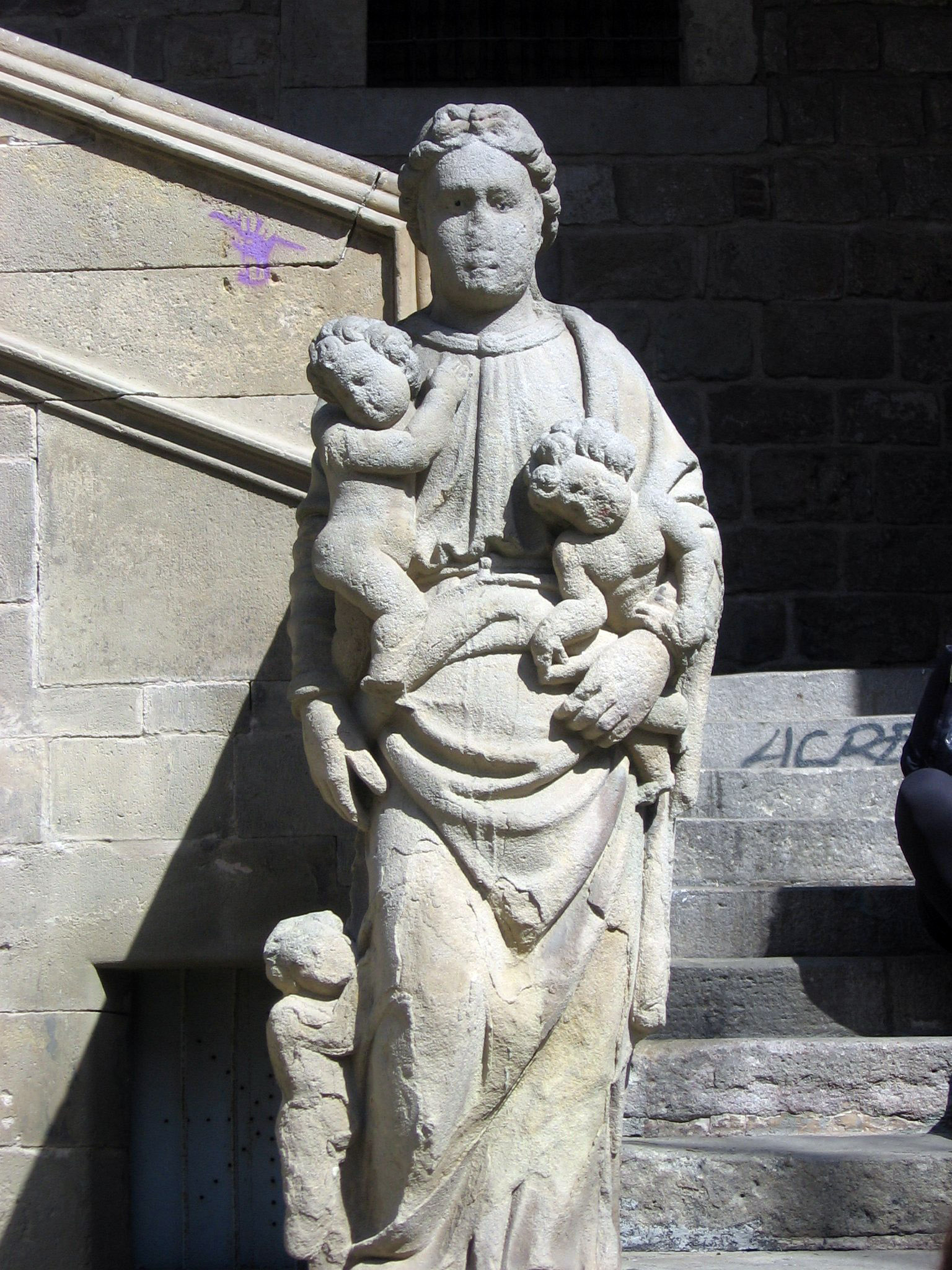
Hospital de la Santa Creu: Caritat (1638).

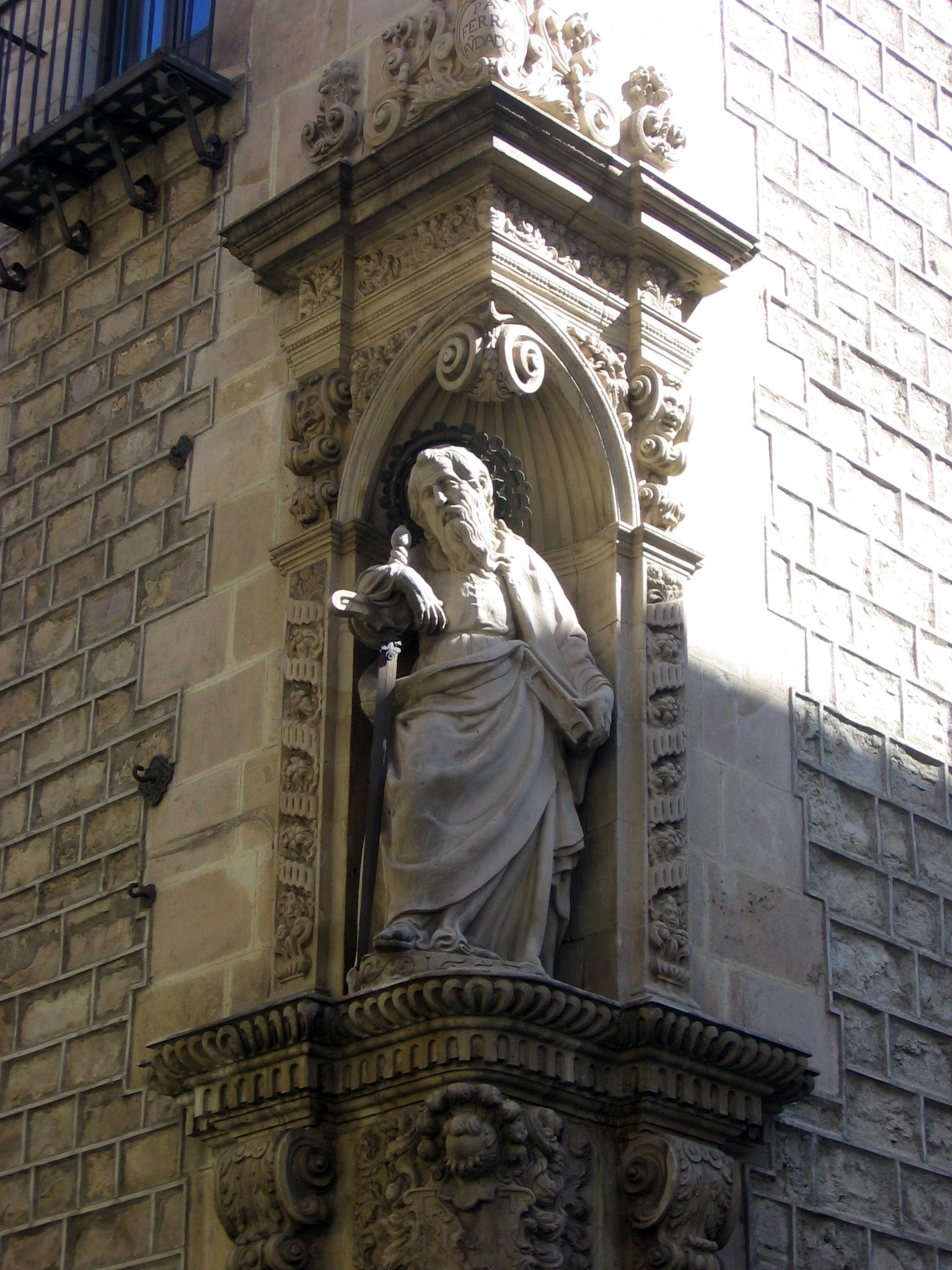
Hospital de la Santa Creu: Sant Pau (1668), by Domènec Rovira el Jove.

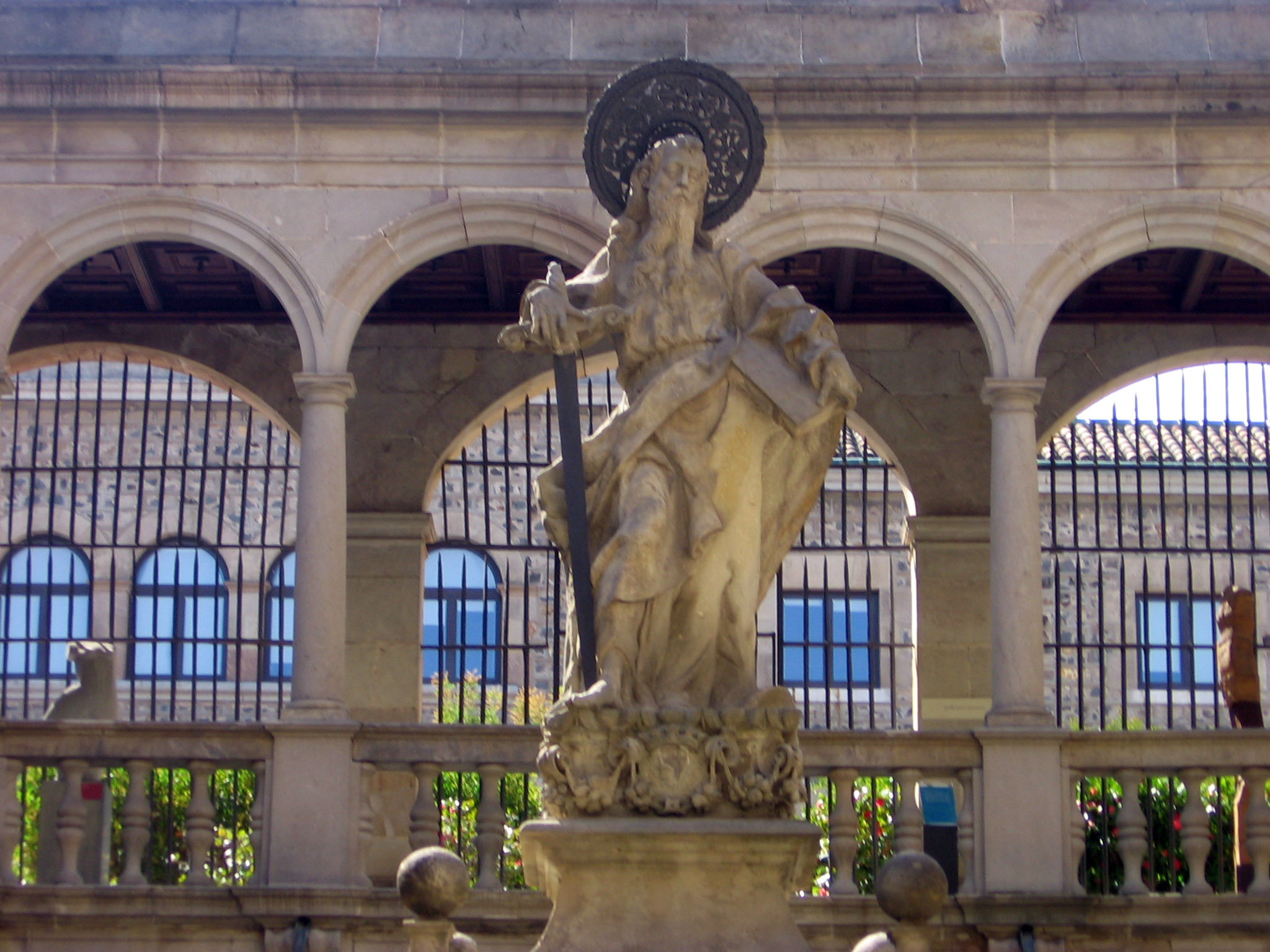
Hospital de la Santa Creu: Sant Pau (1679), by Lluís Bonifaç el Vell.

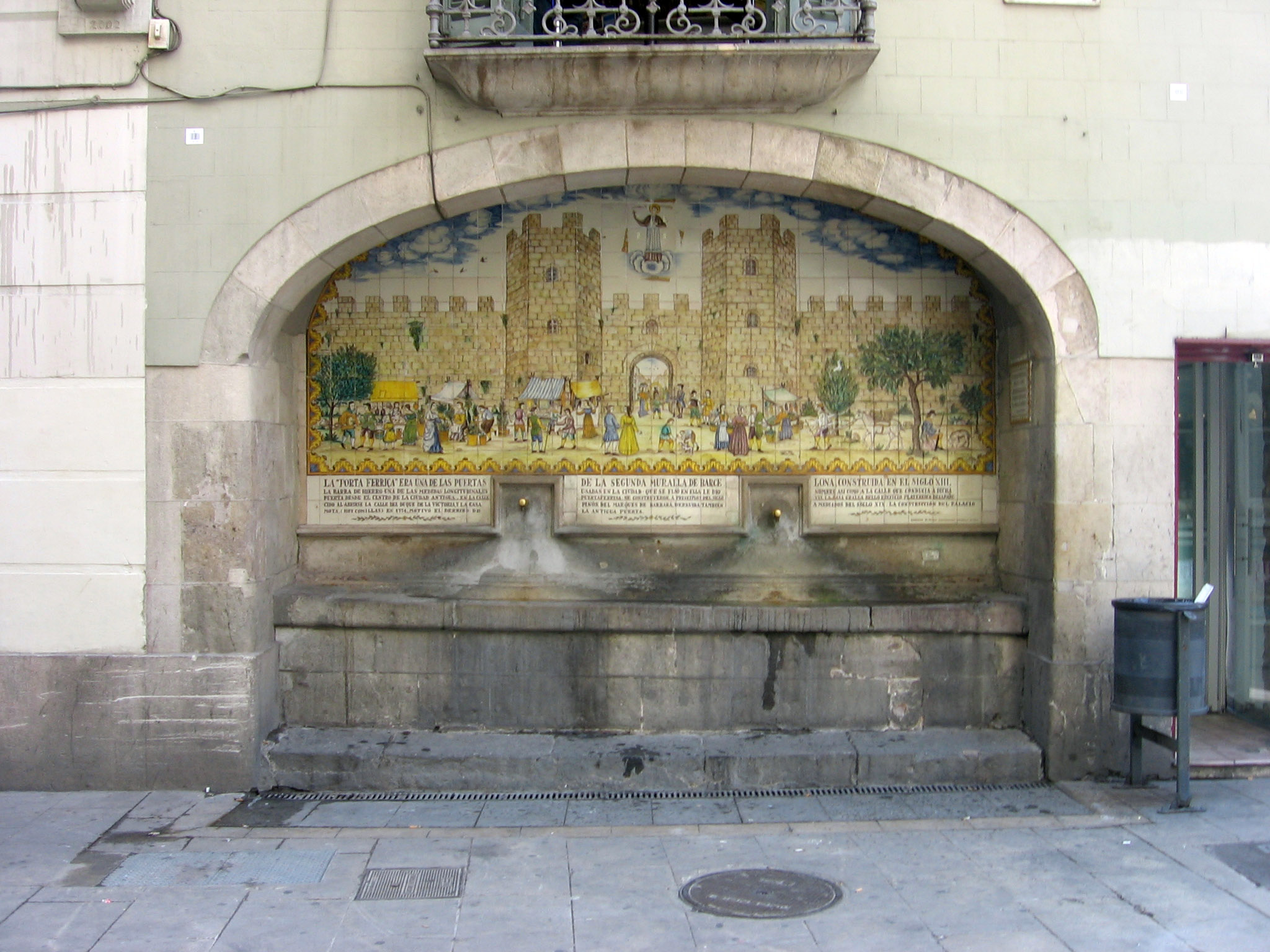
Font de Portaferrissa (1680).

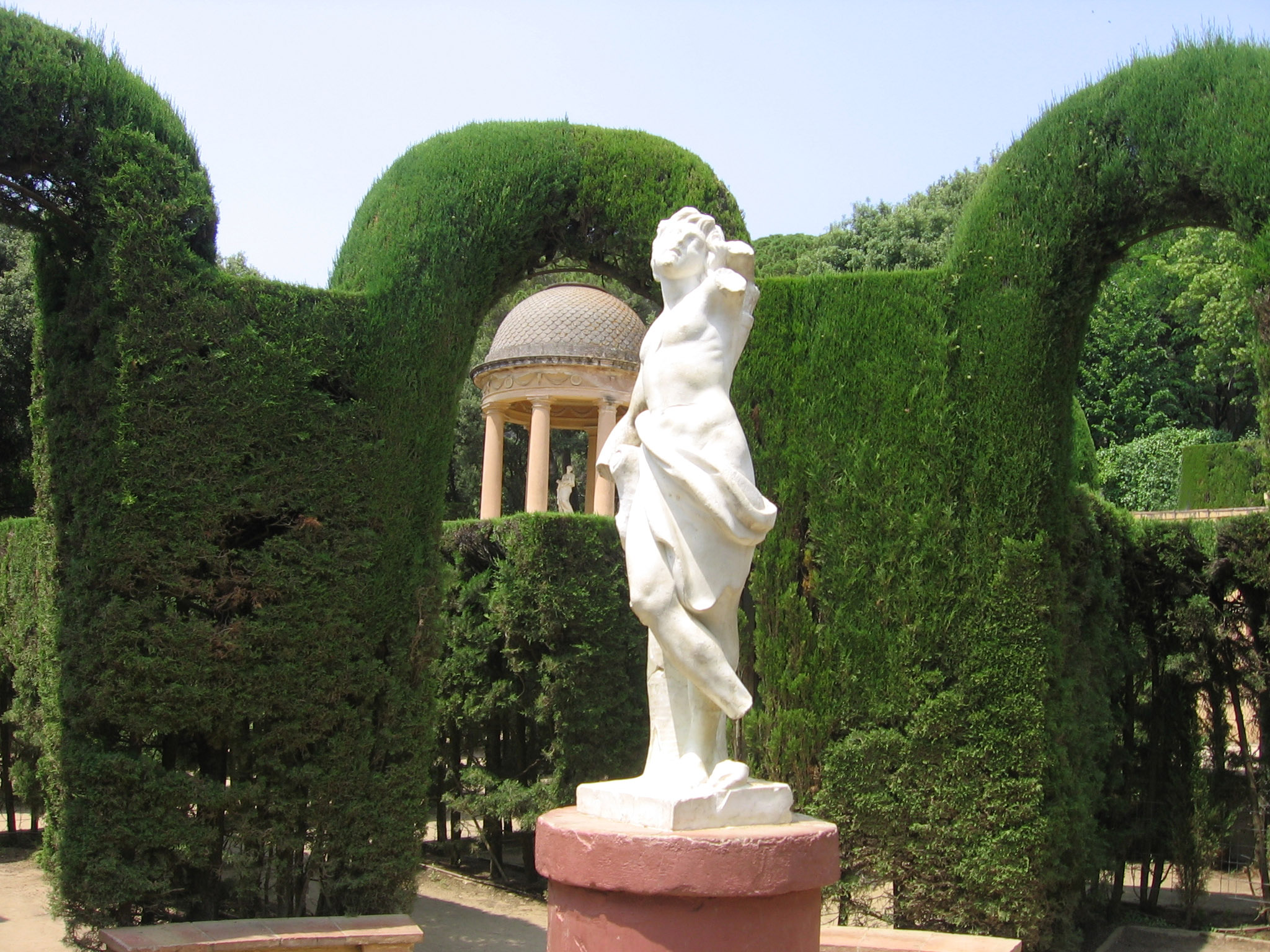
Parc del Laberint d'Horta (18th century): statue of Eros.

=== Nineteenth century ===
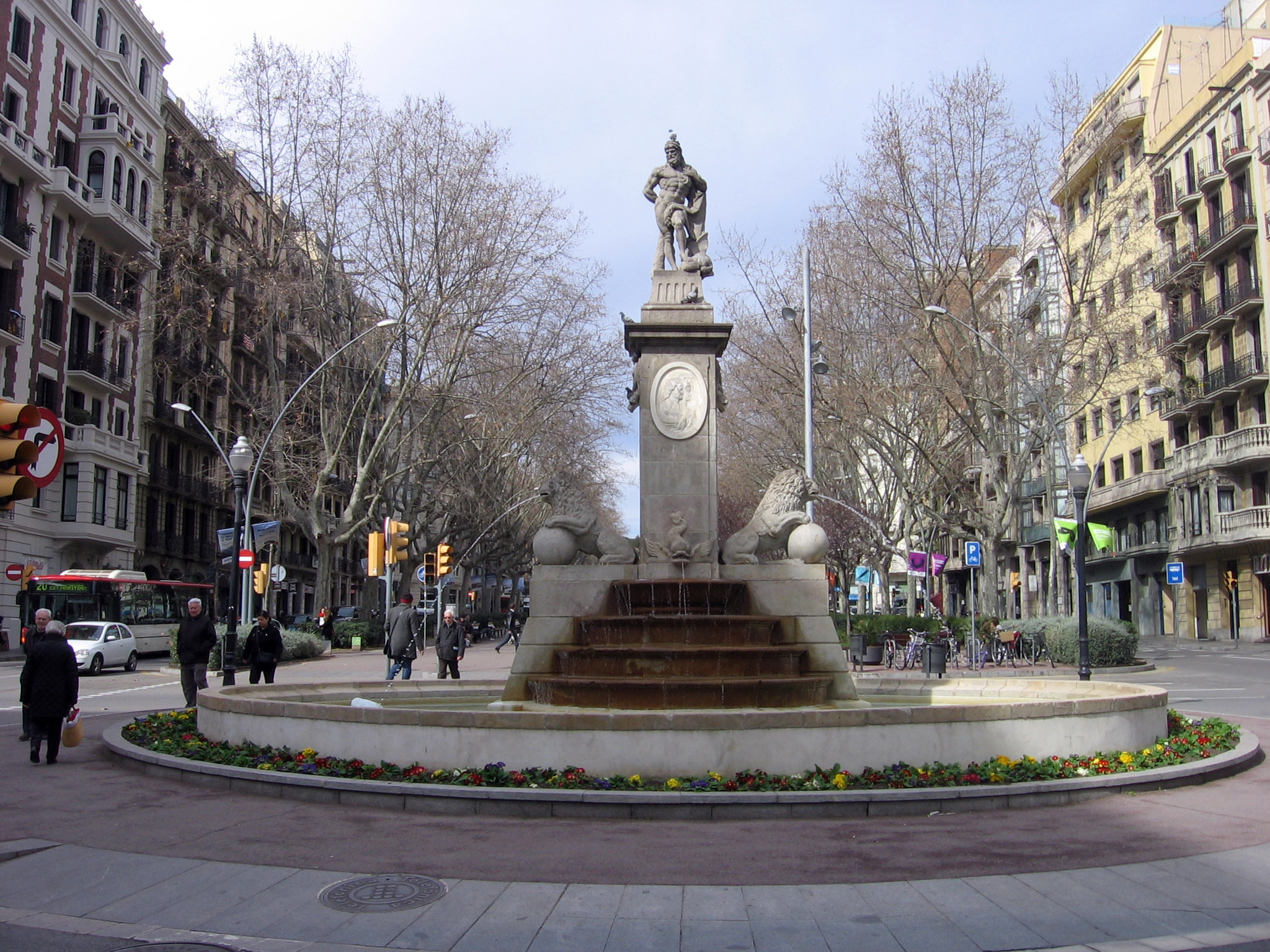
Fountain of Hercules (1802) by Josep Moret and Salvador Gurri, is Barcelona's oldest original statue.

In this period there was a great economic revival, especially related to the textile industry, which also involved a cultural renaissance. Between 1854 and 1859, the city walls were knocked down so the city could expand, especially through the Eixample project drawn up by Ildefons Cerdà in 1859. The revolution of 1868 achieved the demolition of the Citadel, whose grounds of were made into a public park. The population was growing, especially thanks to immigration from the rest of the state, and reached 400,000 at the end of the century. Artistically, the century saw a succession of different political styles including neoclassicism, romanticism and realism.

As in previous periods, the artistic achievements of governments were confined mainly to public fountains. Some public monuments, such as those dedicated to Ferdinand VII (1831) and King Ferdinand (1850), have not survived. However, many such works were made at this time. The oldest was the Hercules Fountain at the crossroads of Passeig de Sant Joan, Barcelona and Carrer de Còrsega, the work done in 1802 by Josep Moret to a design by Salvador Gurri. Initially located in Passeig Nou, or the Esplanada of the Citadel, it has been in its present location since 1928 and is thought to be the oldest public statue in Barcelona.

Other fountains from this period include

- Font del Vell (old fountain) (1816) by Damien Campeny, initially located in Pla del Teatre, next to La Rambla, which was later transferred to the Parc de la Ciutadella (1877) and, lastly, the Plaça de Sants (1975);
- Fountain of Ceres (1825–1830), Celdoni of plaster, located on a Passeig de Gràcia Provença street corner, and in 1874 moved to the Plaça Blasco de Garay in the Poble Sec, and in 1918 in the Plaça de Sant Jordi in Montjuïc;
- Neptune's Fountain (1826), Ferran Adrià, placed at the Moll de la Riba, Barceloneta, and later transferred to the Laribal Gardens and 1983, in the Plaza de la Merced, in front of the basilica;
- Monument to Galceran Marquet (1851) by Damià Campeny and Joseph Anicet Santigosa in the Plaza del Duque de Medina, the first work performed on iron-Town;
- Font del Geni Català (1856), Faust and Joseph Baratta Anicet Santigosa at Pla de Palau;
- Fountain of the Three Graces (1876), in the Plaça Reial, designed by the architect Antoni Rovira i Trias

The Wallace fountains, made in 1872 by Charles-Auguste Lebourg, commissioned by the English philanthropist Sir Richard Wallace, and erected in many European cities as an act of brotherhood; two of the original twelve remain in Barcelona: the Rambla Santa Monica and the Gran Via with Passeig de Gràcia. All of them have four figures of caryatids supporting a hemispherical dome, with a water jet.

As for public buildings, the most important were the two statues placed in niches on both sides of the front door of the new facade of the Hotel de Ville, representing James I the Conqueror and Joan Fiveller, made by Josep Bover in 1844. Just the opposite, in front of the Palau de la Generalitat, in 1871, a statue of St. George was placed in a niche, designed by Andreu Aleu. This facade was also new, since the opening of the Sant Jaume square in 1823 left both institutional buildings facing front. Note that then the Palau de la Generalitat did not harbor this institution, abolished by the Decree of New Plant, but the Royal Court, the Provincial Council and the General Archive of the Crown of Aragon.

Statues located in the lobby of the University of Barcelona, a monumental architectural complex built between 1863 and 1882. Rogent Elijah, the architect, proposed the statues, by brothers Agapito and Venanci Vallmitjana, made in 1865 and 1876. They placed five figures representing science and knowledge throughout the history of Spain: San Isidoro de Sevilla, for the Visigoth kingdom; Averroes, for the Spanish-Muslim period; Alfonso X, for the medieval period in Castile; Ramon Llull, for the same period in the Crown of Aragon; and Joan Lluís Vives, for the Renaissance period.

Charity, the work of Joan Serra in 1880, is located at the House of Charity; and allegories of Commerce and Industry adorn the front of the casino building, formerly the mercantile exchange, by Rossend Novas and Joan Roig i Solé, 1888.

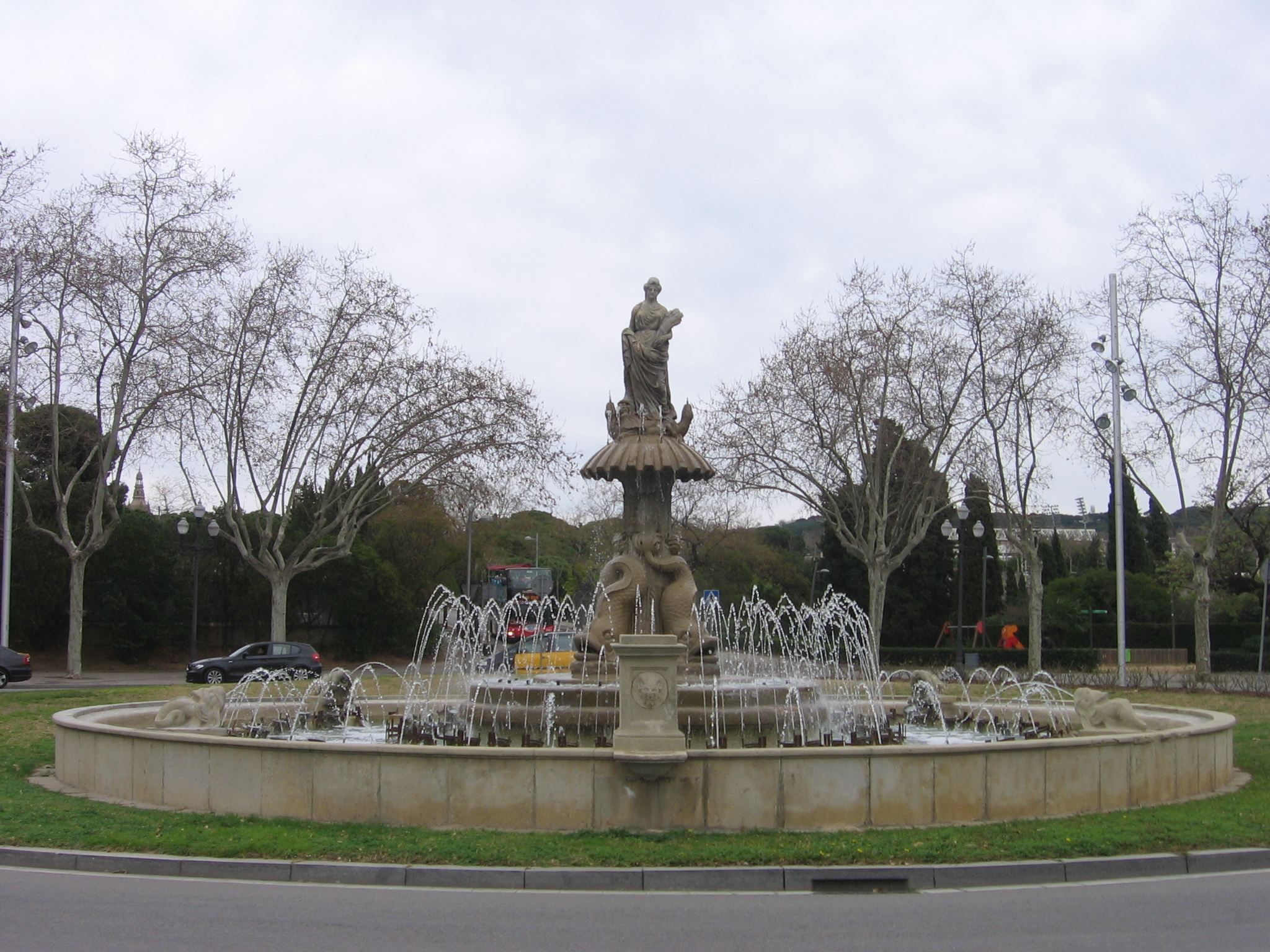
Font de Ceres (1825–1830), Plaça de Sant Jordi (Montjuïc).

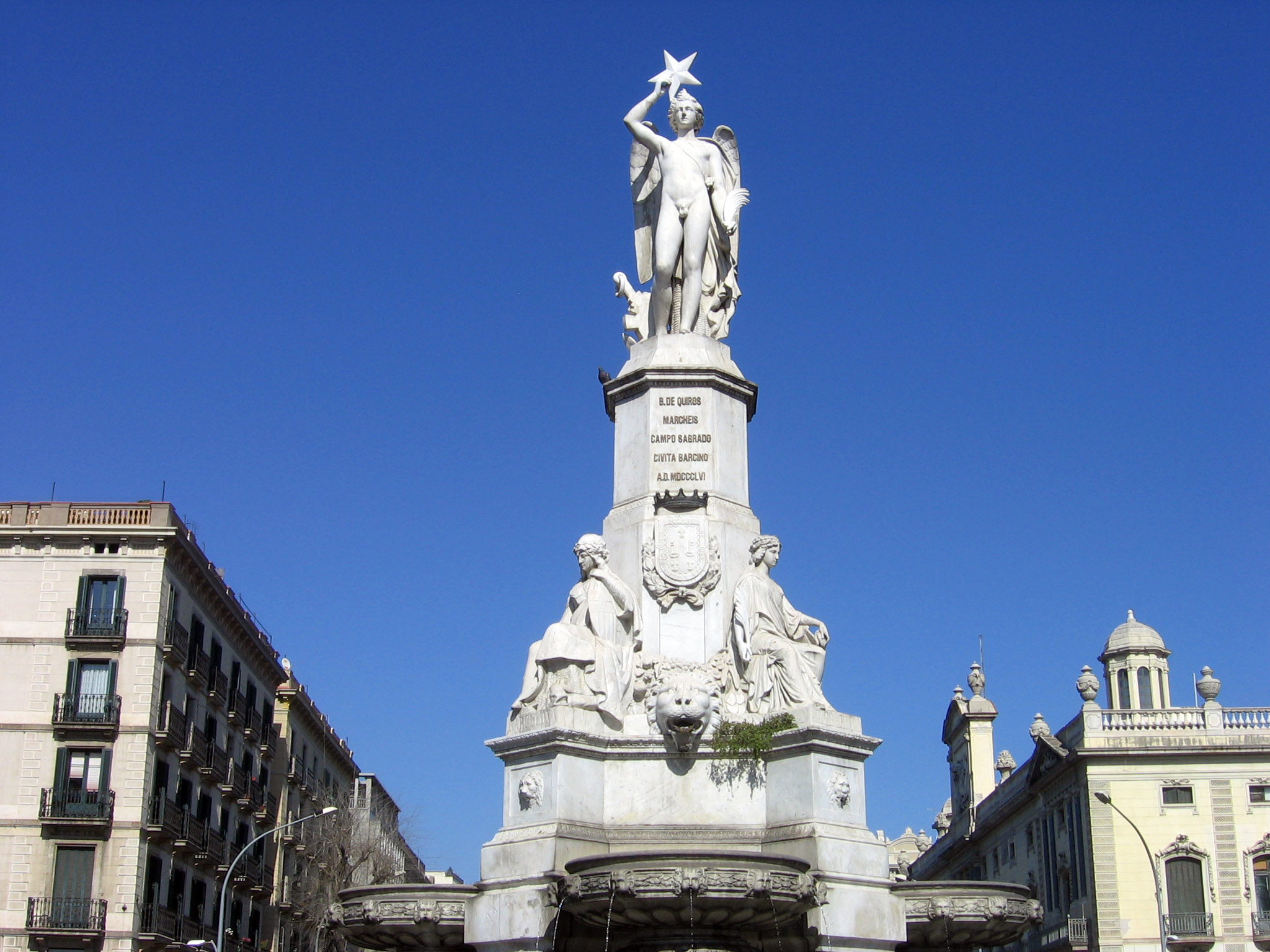
Font del Geni Català (1856), by Faust Baratta i Josep Anicet Santigosa, Pla de Palau.

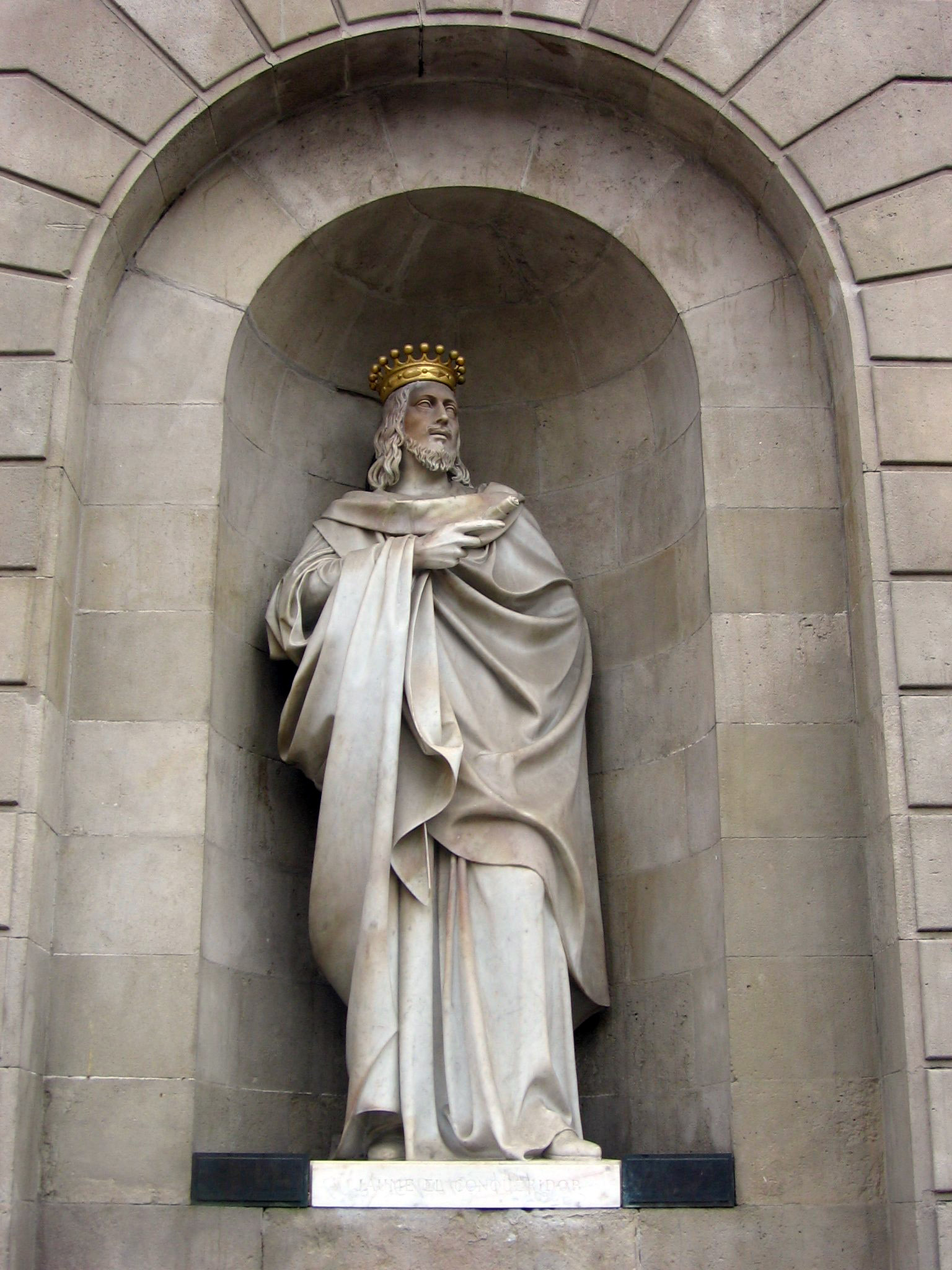
Jaume I el Conqueridor (1844), by Josep Bover, Casa de la Ciutat de Barcelona.

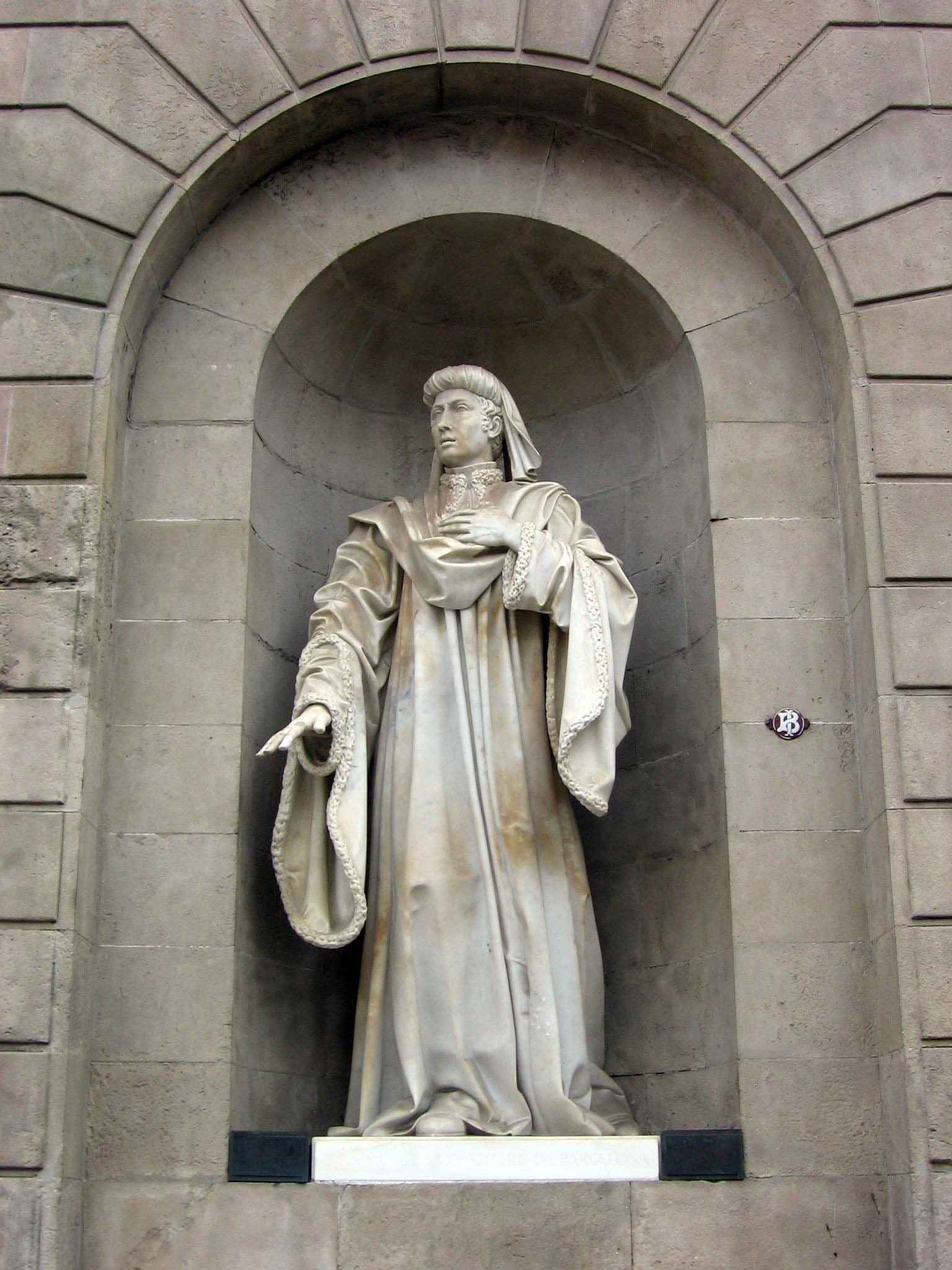
Joan Fiveller, (1844), by Josep Bover, Casa de la Ciutat de Barcelona.

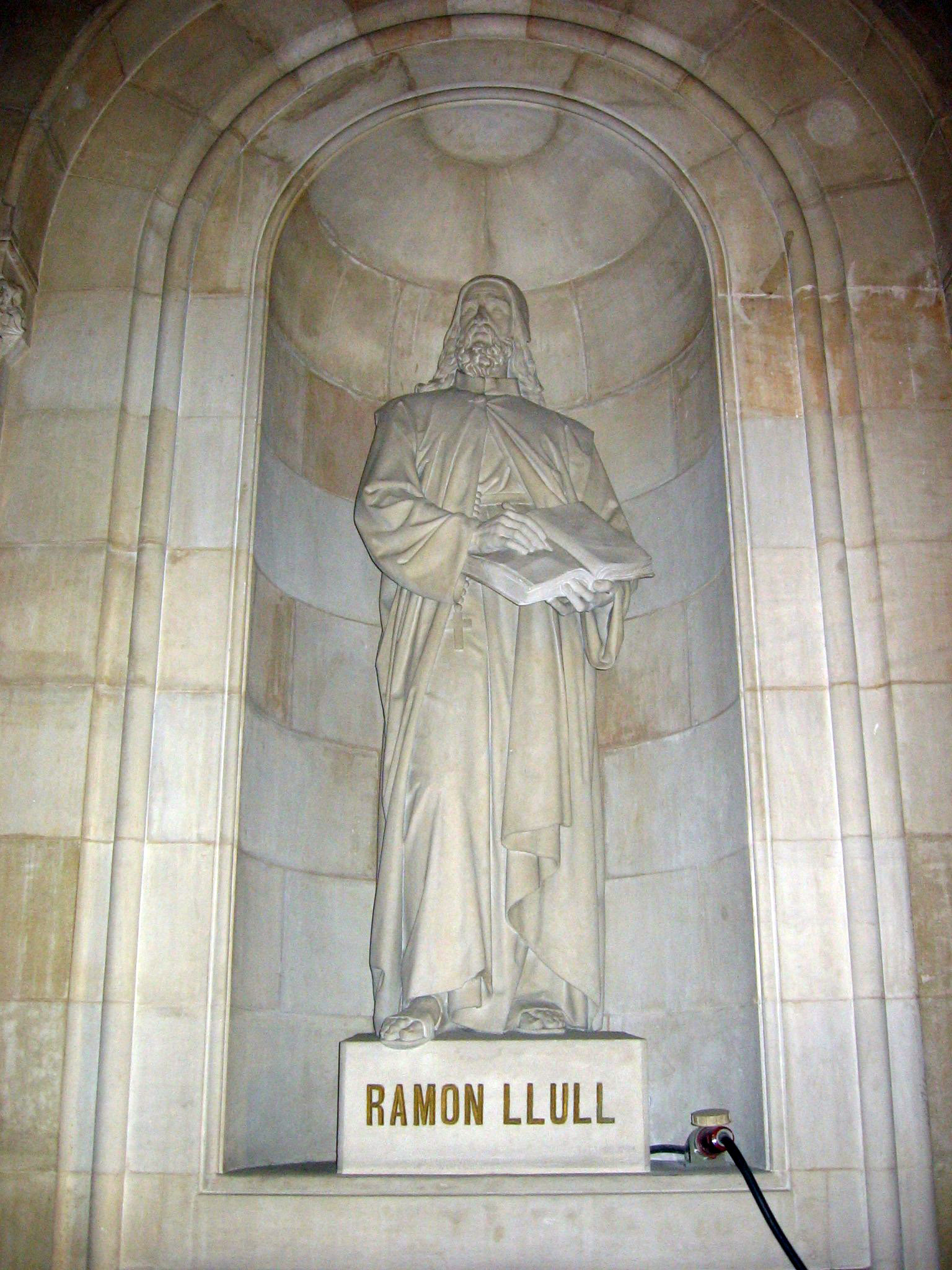
Ramon Llull (1865), Universitat de Barcelona.

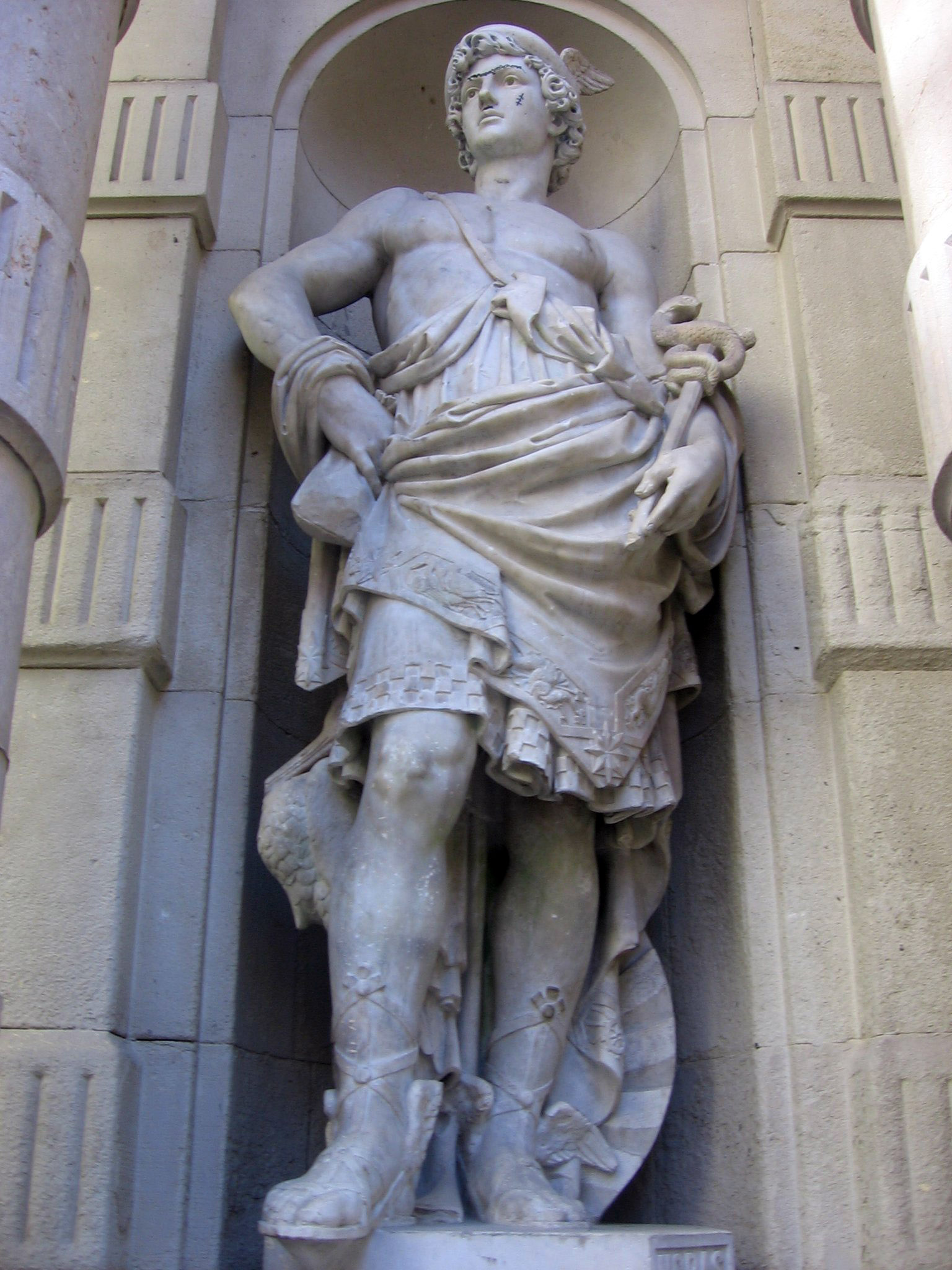
Comerç (1888), by Rossend Nobas, Casino Mercantil.

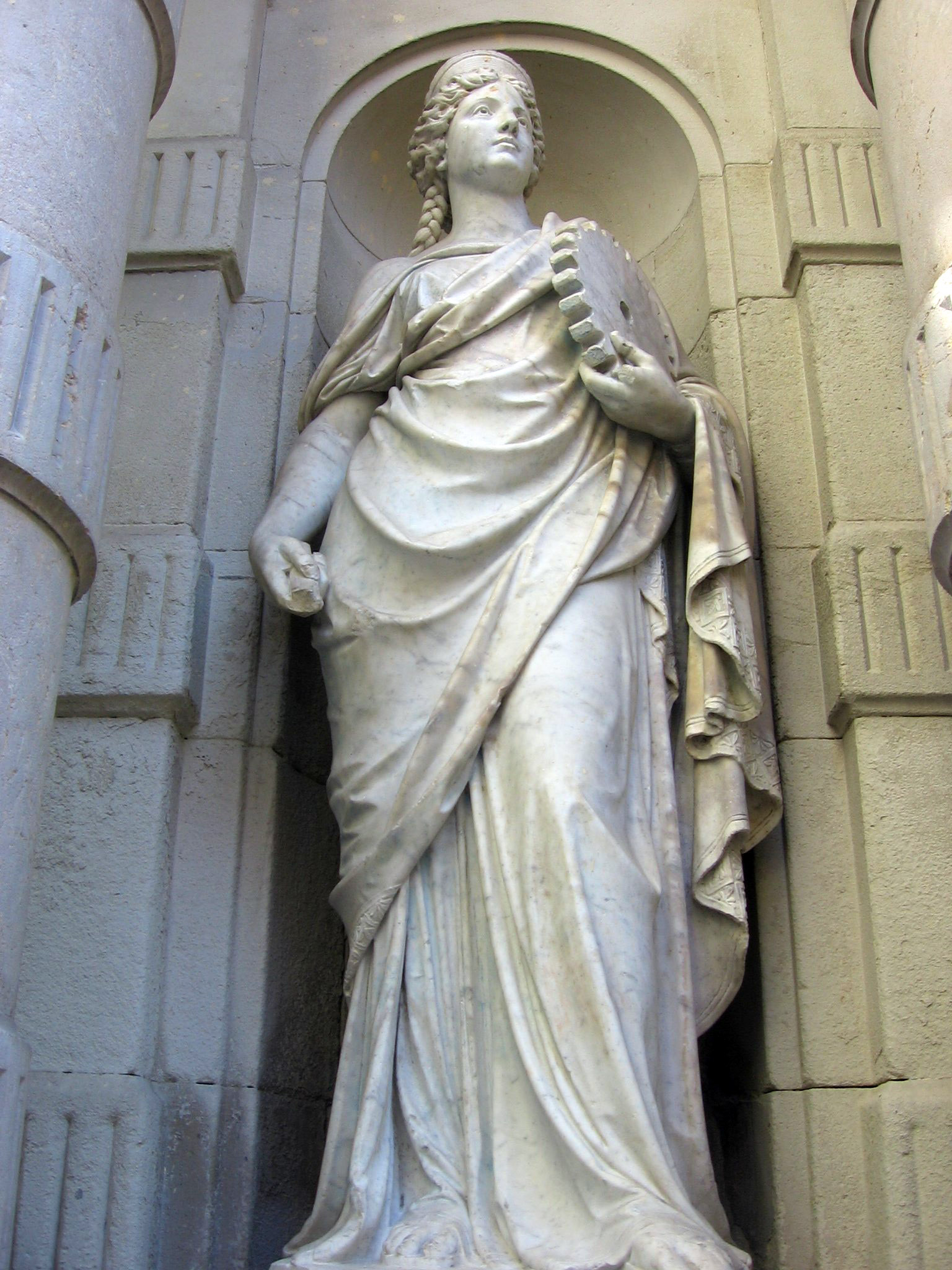
Indústria (1888), Casino Mercantil.

==== Expo 1888 ====
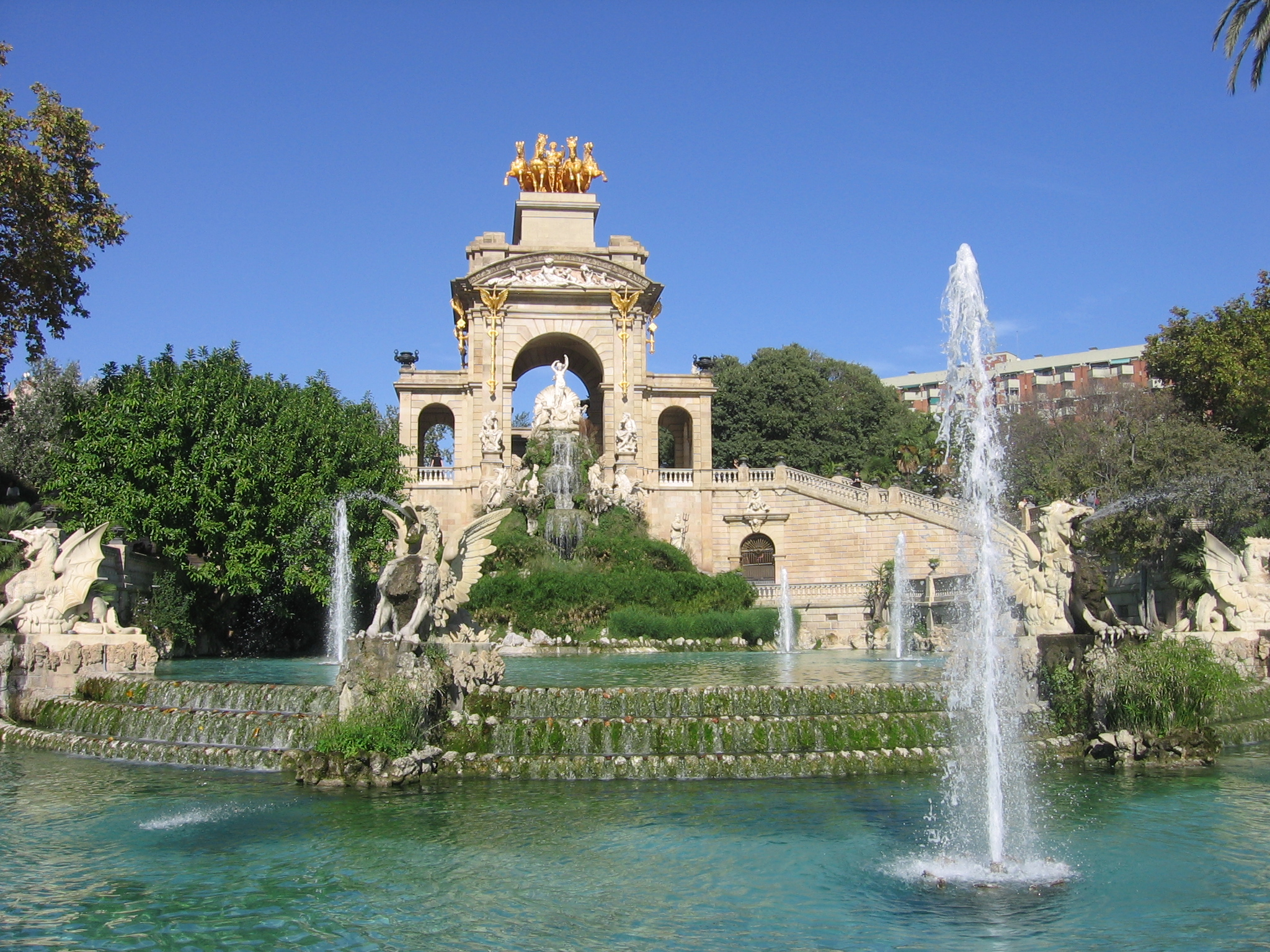
Fountain Parc de la Ciutadella (1875–1888)

At the end of the century, an event that was a huge impact on both economic and social planning, art and culture for the city, was the 1888 Barcelona Universal Exposition, held 20 May to 9 December 1888 in Parc de la Ciutadella, a former army property acquired by the city in 1868. The art exhibition was an incentive to the improvement of infrastructure throughout the city, in a huge leap in modernization and development. Furthermore, the exhibition marked the emergence of a new artistic style, modernism. Until the beginning of the 20th century, the Gothic had prevailed in architecture and art in Barcelona and defined the style of the city. The statues made for the exhibition were the most important contribution to public art in the city's history and coincided with a generation of sculptors in one of the brightest moments of Catalan art history.

In 1872, Josep Fontserè was commissioned to remodel Ciutadella Park, and designed gardens and a green-screened central square, a circular promenade and a fountain, two lakes and woodland, and ancillary buildings and infrastructure such as Born Market.

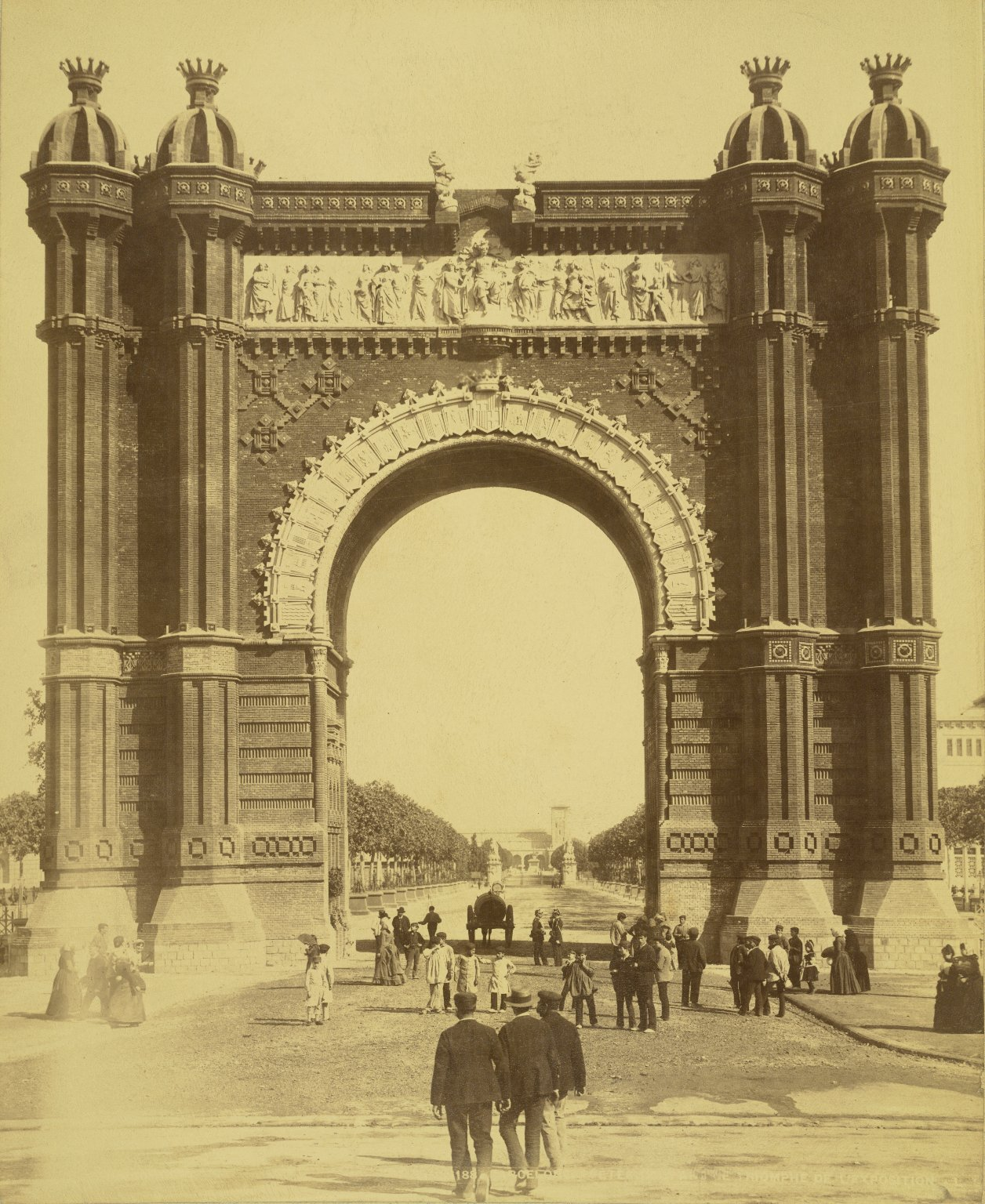
The historic Arc de Triomf

Entrance to the exhibition took place through the Arc de Triomf, a monument created for the occasion by Josep Vilaseca. It remains at its original location.

Inspired by Neo-Mudéjar, it had a height of 30 meters and was decorated with rich sculptural ornamentation, the work of several artists: Joseph Reynes carved in friso superior Barcelona receives nations; Josep Llimona carried on the back of the top Cast rewards to the participants of the exhibition; on the right side Antoni Vilanova i Andreu made allegories of Industry Agriculture and Trade; left, Torquat Tasso elaborated allegories for the Science and Art. Finally, Manuel Fuxà i Leal and Pere Carbonell created four female sculptures, Fame.

In the Hall of San Juan, now Passeig de Lluís Companys – a long avenue, 50m wide, featured balustrades of wrought iron, mosaics, and large pavement lanterns, all designed by Pere Falqués. Throughout this tour were placed eight large bronze statues depicting famous people of the history of Catalonia:

- Wilfred the Hairy by Venanci Vallmitjana
- Roger de Lauria by Joseph Reynes
- Bernard Desclot by Manuel Fuxà
- Rafael Casanova by Rossend Novas
- Ramon Berenguer I by Josep Llimona
- Pere Albert by Antonio Vilanova
- Antoni Viladomat by Torquat Tasso
- James Fabre by Pere Carbonell

In 1914 the Casanova statue was moved to the Ronda de Sant Pere – cantonada Ali Bey – and replaced by another, dedicated to Pau Claris, by Rafael Atché. During the Spanish Civil War six statues were removed, and only the original Roger de Lauria and Antoni Viladomat remained in place. Five were cast in 1950 to make the image of the Virgin of Mercy of the Basilica of the Merced, while the Pau Claris municipal was stored in a warehouse. It was restored in 1977. Also, the end of the tour were placed two sculptures representing trade and industry, the work of Agapito Vallmitjana; Two more dedicated to the Agriculture and Navy by Venanci Vallmitjana were placed at another entrance to Avenida Marques de Argentera.

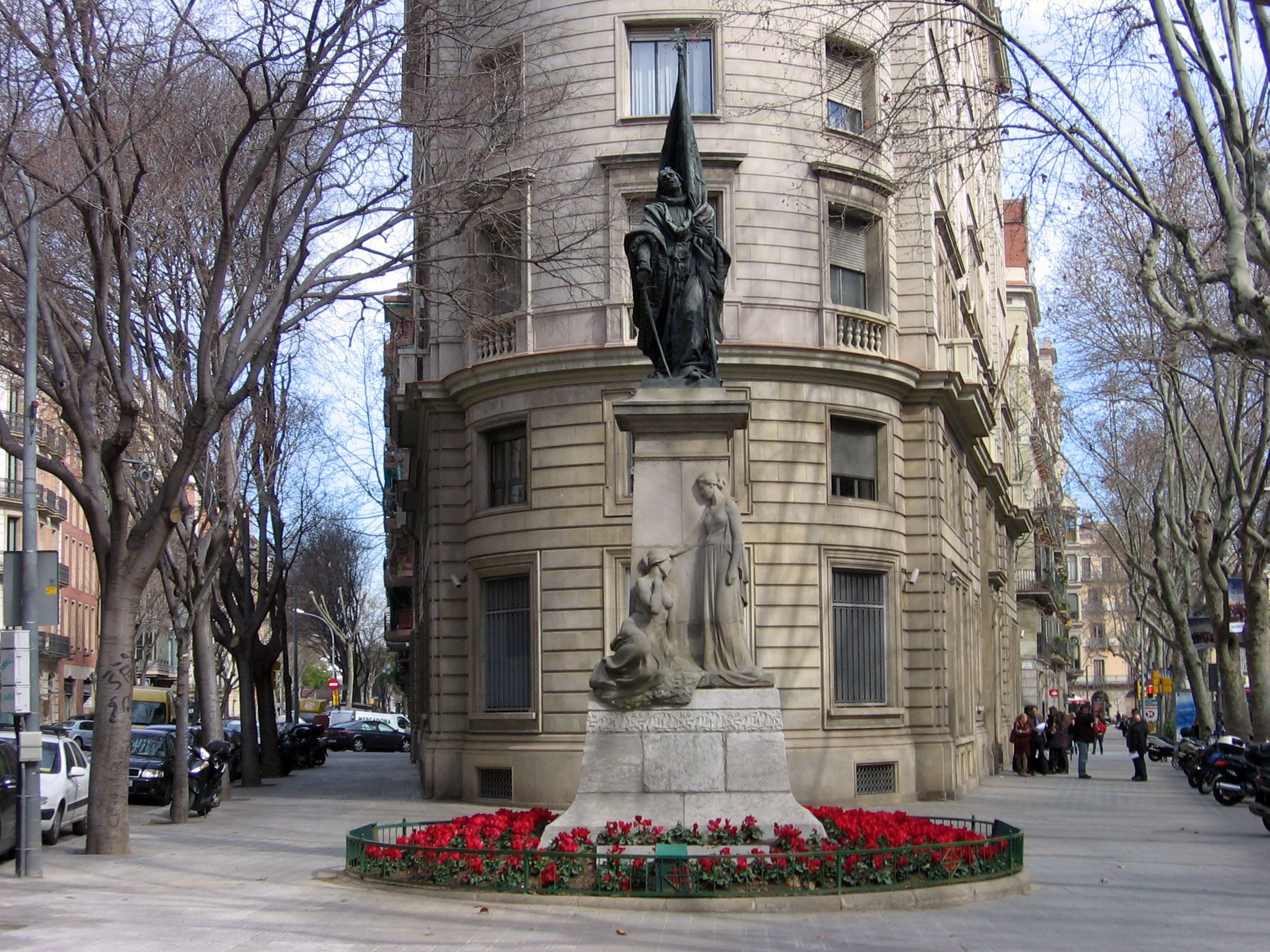
Monument to Rafael Casanova (1888) by Rossend Novas. Considered a Catalan icon, his monument usually stage tributes and wreaths held in Day of Catalonia.

At the Expo site, in addition to buildings and pavilions built for the event, highlighting the Monumental Cascade, designed by Fontserè in collaboration with Gaudí, which made the project hydraulic and designed an artificial cave under the waterfall. The architectural complex has a central structure in the form of triumphal arch with its two pavilions and two side wings with steps, hosting a pool divided into two levels. The monument stands out for its profusion sculpture, which involved several of the best sculptors of the moment: it emphasizes the group The Quadriga Aurora of Rossend Novas and The Birth of Venus of Venanci Vallmitjana; the fronton is the work of Francesc Pagès and Serratos. Other sculptures are set: Amphitrite of Joseph Gamot; Neptune and Leda of Manuel Fuxà; and Danae by John Flotats. However, Rafael Atché realized four Gryphon that remove water from the mouth to the bottom of the monument.

Other statues were placed for the Exhibition: the Lady umbrella (1884) by Joan Roig i Solé, located on the present site of Zoo, and that over time has become an emblematic building of the city; Homage to Aribau (1884) by Josep Vilaseca and Manuel Fuxà, the Avenue of the Linden trees -the original stone of 934 was replaced by a bronze copy of Henry Monk; Figures to scientists Jaume Salvador (1884) and Félix de Azara (1886), Edward B. Alentorn at the Geology Museum; the Hunter lions (1884), of Agapito and Vallmitjana Abarca, one of the rides in the park; and Equestrian statue of General Prim (1887), by Louis Puiggener, located in front of the Palace of Industry is currently where the Zoo – although the original was destroyed in 1936 and later restored by Frederic Marès.

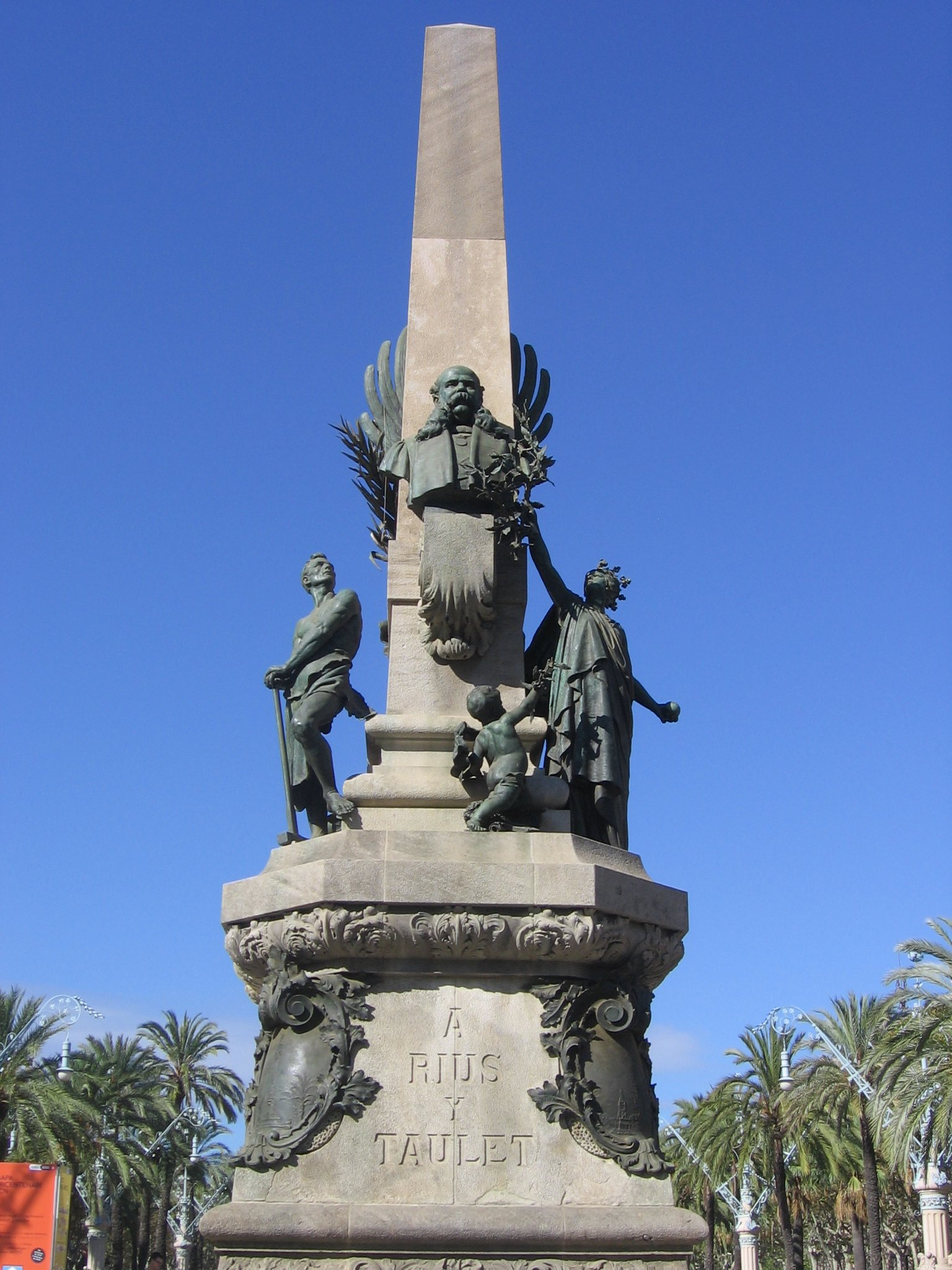
Rius i Taulet Monument (1897–1901) of Pere Falqués and Manuel Fuxà Passeig de Lluís Companys.

Later, between 1897 and 1901, was built at the entrance to the Parc de la Ciutadella Rius i Taulet Monument, who was mayor during the Exhibition and one of the main promoters of the project designed by the architect Pere Falqués and the sculptor Manuel Fuxà; also participated Eusebi Arnau, author of the figure of Barcelona. The monument consists of a pedestal, which includes both sides of bronze shields representing the four major projects promoted by the mayor: Parc de la Ciutadella, Universal Exhibition, Columbus Monument and Gran Via the Catalan Parliament. The base is an obelisk where the bust of the mayor, surrounded by two figures, one Labour and one allegory of Barcelona, offered a branch of palm. On the back is a winged Fame, and there are also three small geniuses symbolizing Industry, Science, and Art.

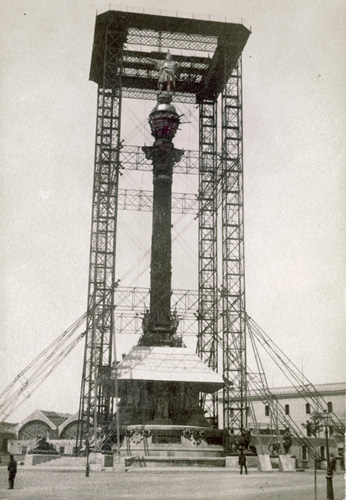
Columbus Monument, Barcelona

Outside the grounds of the exhibition were also constructed several monuments and works of statuary, notably the Columbus Monument, located in Portal de la Pau, between junction Las Ramblas and the Passeig de Colom, opposite Barcelona's old port. Built in honor of the discoverer Christopher Columbus, it was opened on 1 June 1888. The monument was designed by Cayetano Buigas and has a height of 60 meters. The statue of Columbus is located on an iron column, and it is a work in bronze by the sculptor Rafael Atché of 7 meters. The monument is divided into three sections: a circular base, with four flights of stairs to 6 meters wide, with eight statues of Leon and eight reliefs with the shields of the Spanish provinces and Top acts performed by Columbus; an estate eight sides, four of them arranged as buttresses in the form of a cross with allegorical statues of Catalonia, Aragon, Castile and León, as well as figures Bernardo Buil, Pedro Margarit Jaume Ferrer de Blanes and Luis de Santángel; the column Corinthian with a base figures caravels, Gryphon and winged Fames, the capital representations of Europe, Africa, Asia and America, a crown prince, a hemisphere-for the recent discovery of Terrestrial globe and the Columbus statue. The sculpture was awarded through public tender workshops and sculptors Josep Llimona (bas) Antonio Vilanova (bas) Rossend Novas (spurs), Francisco Pastor (capital) Pere Carbonell (Catalonia), Joseph casing (Aragon lions heraldic) Joseph Gamot (Castile, Luis de Santángel), Rafael Atché (Lion statue Columbus), Manuel Fuxà (Father Boil) Francesc Pagès and Serratos (Jaume Ferrer de Blanes) and Edward B. Alentorn (Pere Margarit). With time, Columbus has become one of the most emblematic monuments of the city.

Other works in the context of the exhibition but located outside the precincts were: A López and López (1884), in the Plaza Antonio López, designed by architect Josep Oriol Mestres and the sculptor Venanci Vallmitjana relief Puiggener Louis, Joan Roig i Solé, Rossend Novas and Francesc Pagès and Serratos -destruït 1936, was restored in 1944 by Frederic mud-flats; Joan Güell i Ferrer (1888), in the Gran Via de les Corts Catalanes with Boulevard of Catalonia, designed by the architect Martorell Joan and sculptors Rossend Novas, Torquat Tasso, Edward B. Alentorn Maximí Hall and Francesc Pagès and Serratos -igualment destroyed in 1936 and rebuilt in 1945 by Frederic Marès; and Josep Anselm Clave monument (1888), initially located in the Rambla Catalonia, Valencia and transferred in 1956 to the Passeig de Sant Joan, Josep Vilaseca by architect and sculptor Manuel Fuxà.

Finally, note that in 1892 stood at Rambla Square of Catalonia Canaletes Fountain by Pere Falqués, which eventually became an emblem of the city and usually place meeting the fans of Barcelona Football Club in the celebrations of the team.

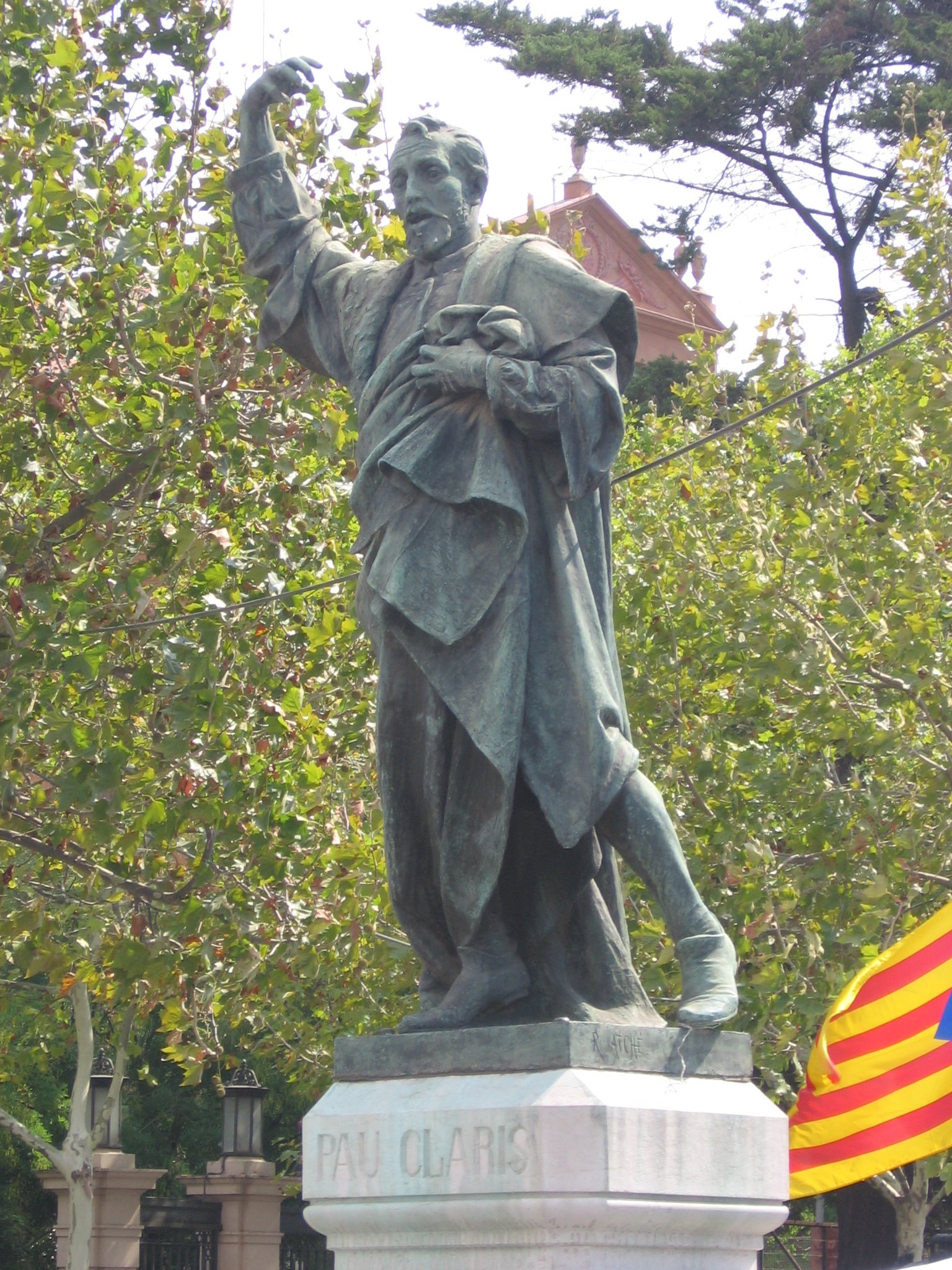
Pau Claris (1880), de Rafael Atché, Passeig de Lluís Companys.

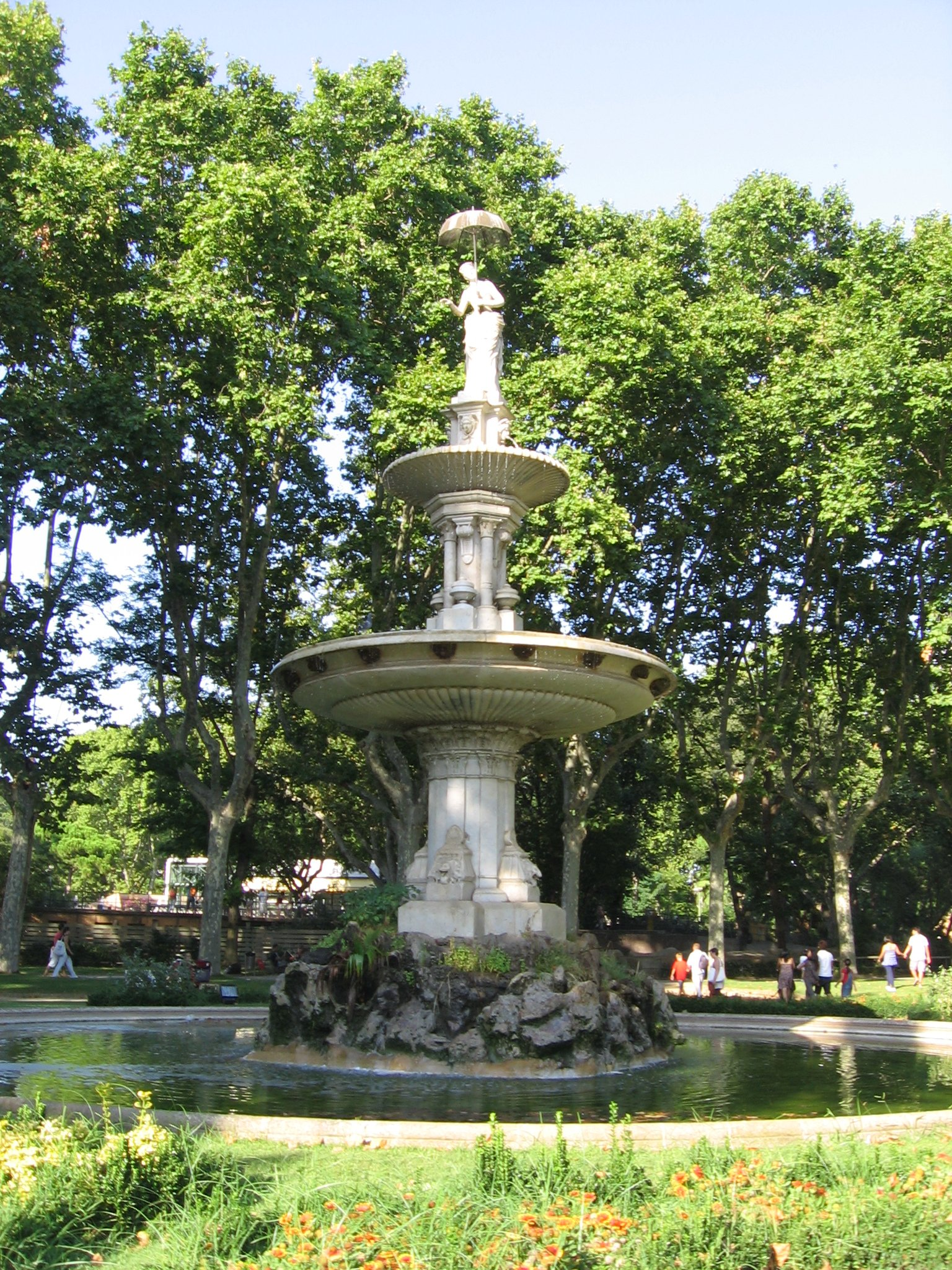
Dama del paraigua (1884), de Joan Roig i Solé, Barcelona Zoo.

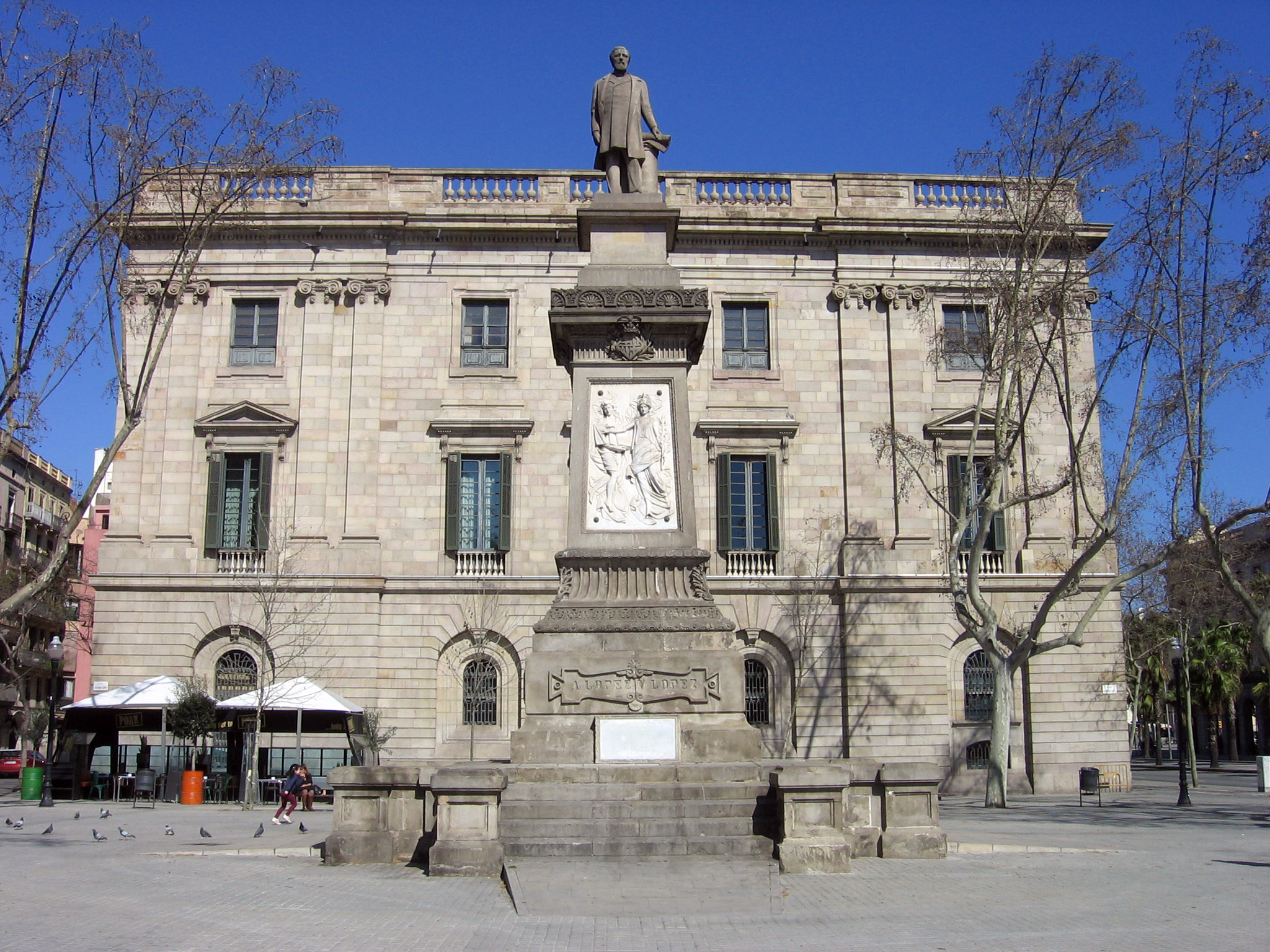
A López i López (1884), by Josep Oriol Mestres and Venanci Vallmitjana, Plaça Antonio López.

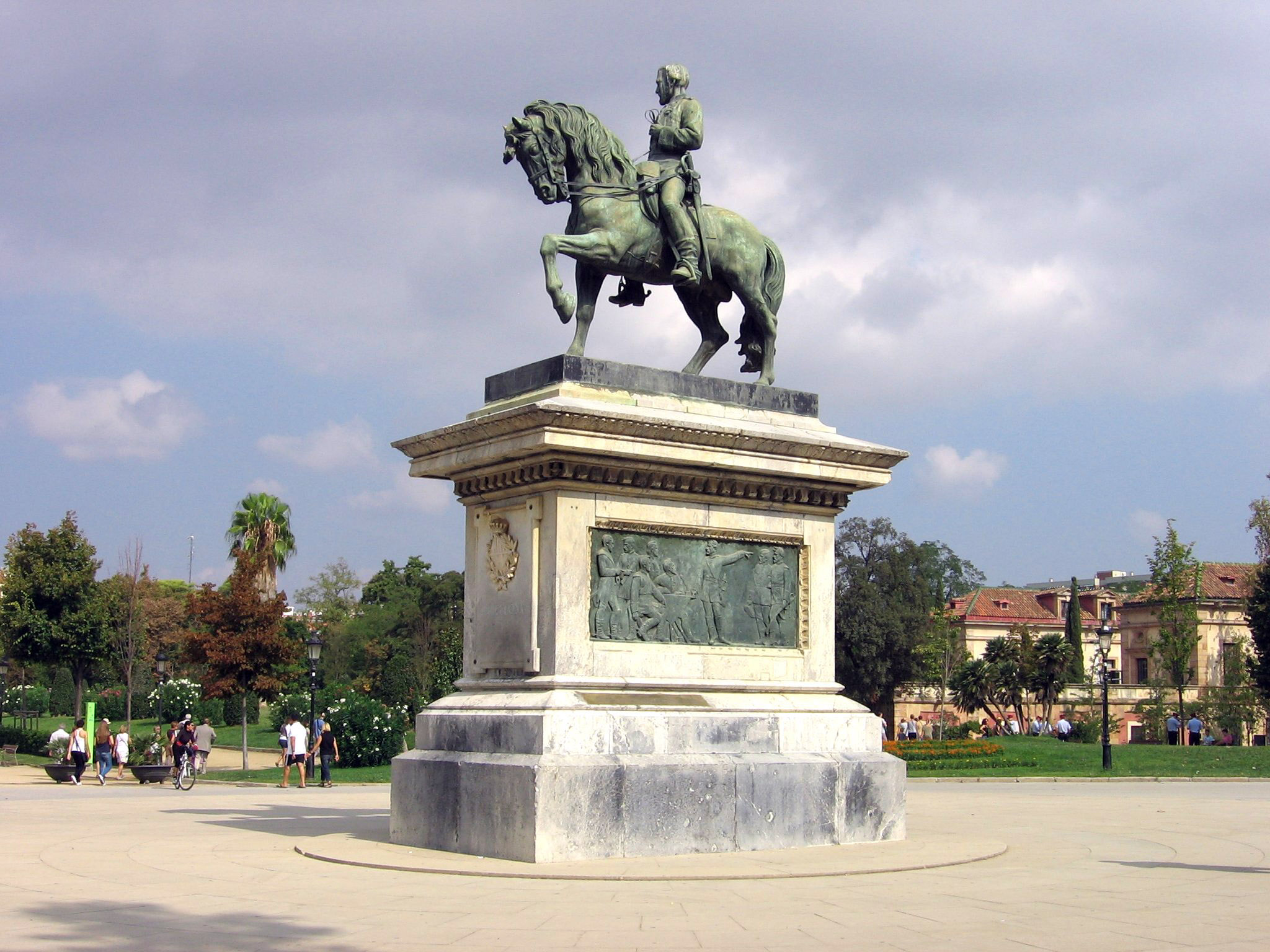
Estàtua eqüestre del General Prim (1887), by Lluís Puiggener, Parc de la Ciutadella.

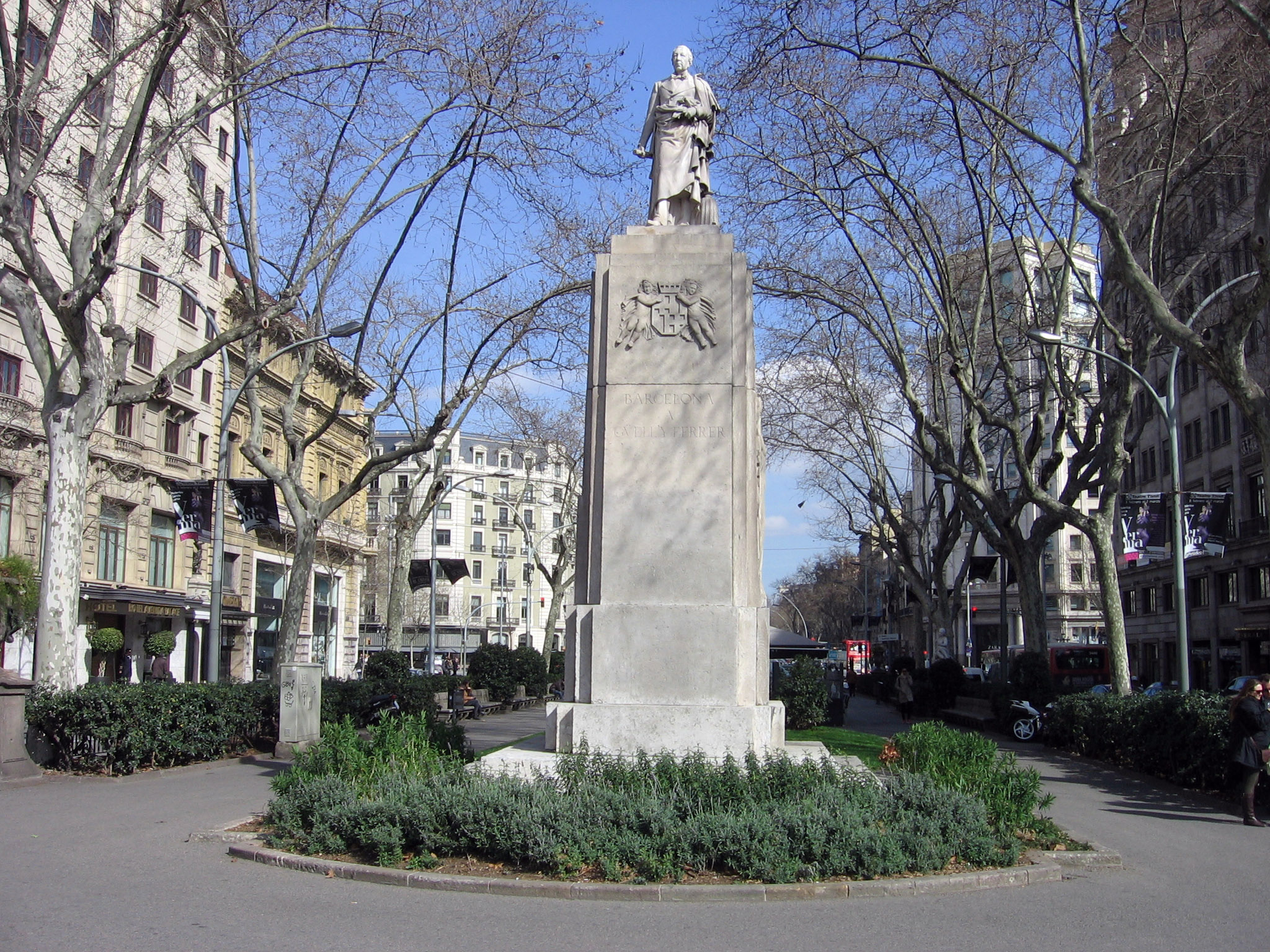
A Joan Güell i Ferrer (1888), by Joan Martorell i Rossend Nobas, Gran Via de les Corts Catalanes with Rambla de Catalunya.

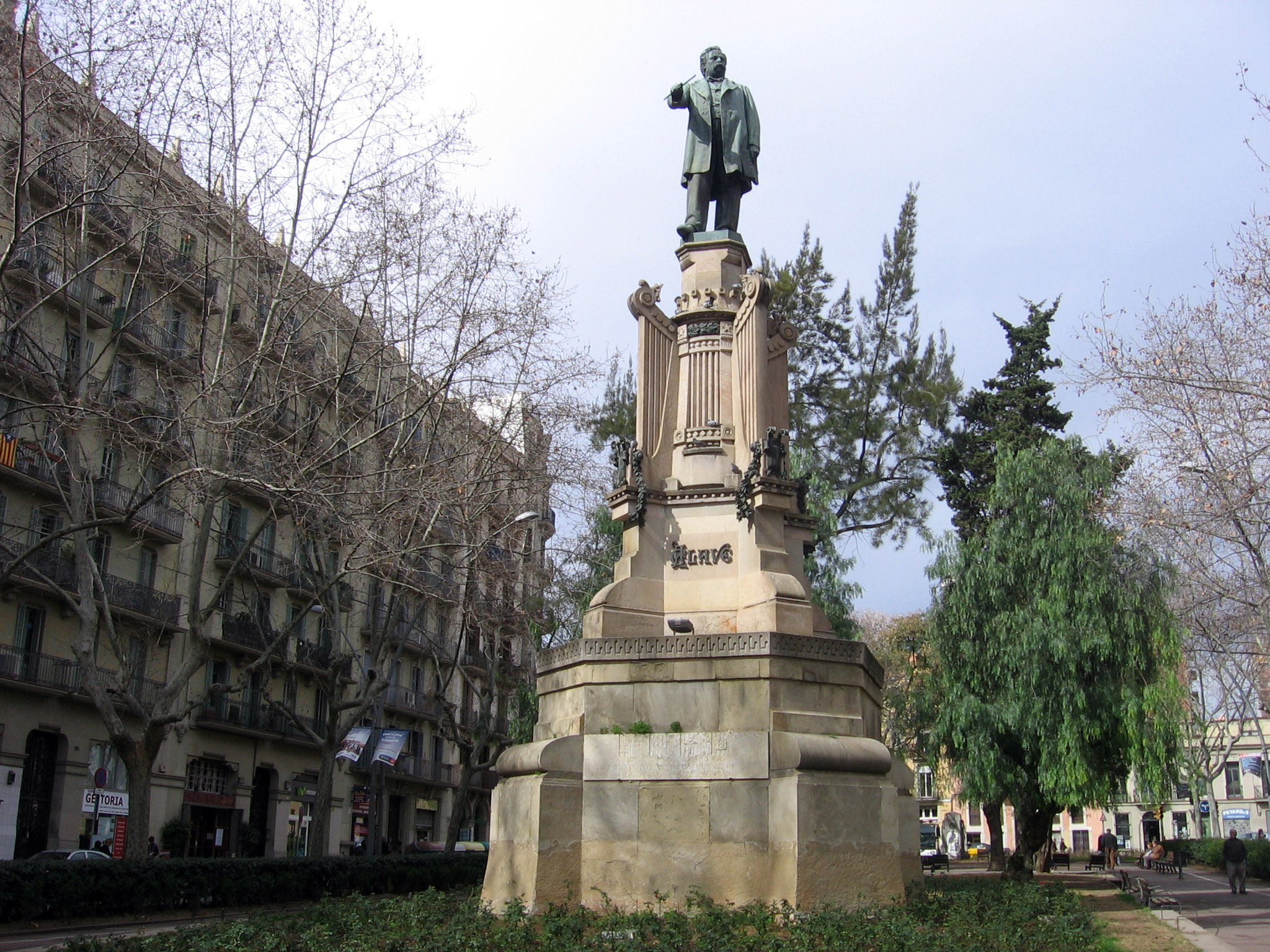
Monument a Josep Anselm Clavé (1888), by Josep Vilaseca and Manuel Fuxà, Passeig de Sant Joan.

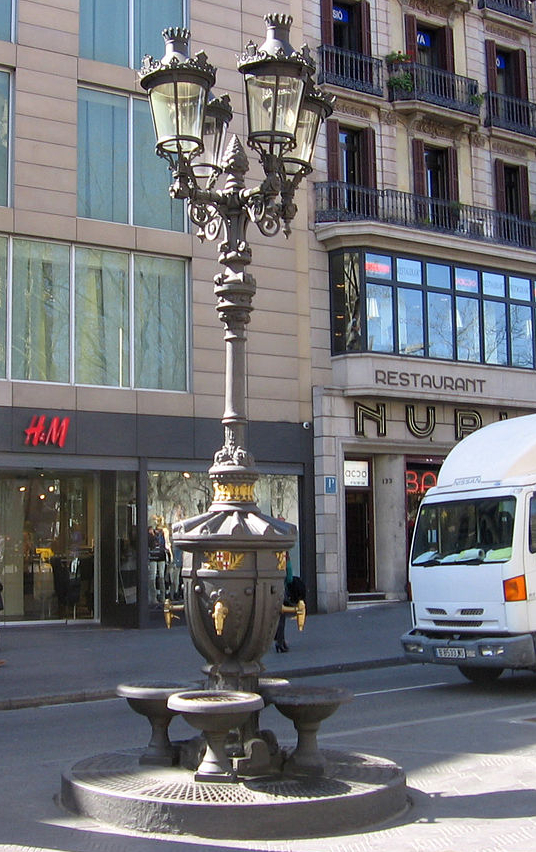
Font de Canaletes (1892), by Pere Falqués, Rambla with Plaça de Catalunya.

=== Twentieth century ===
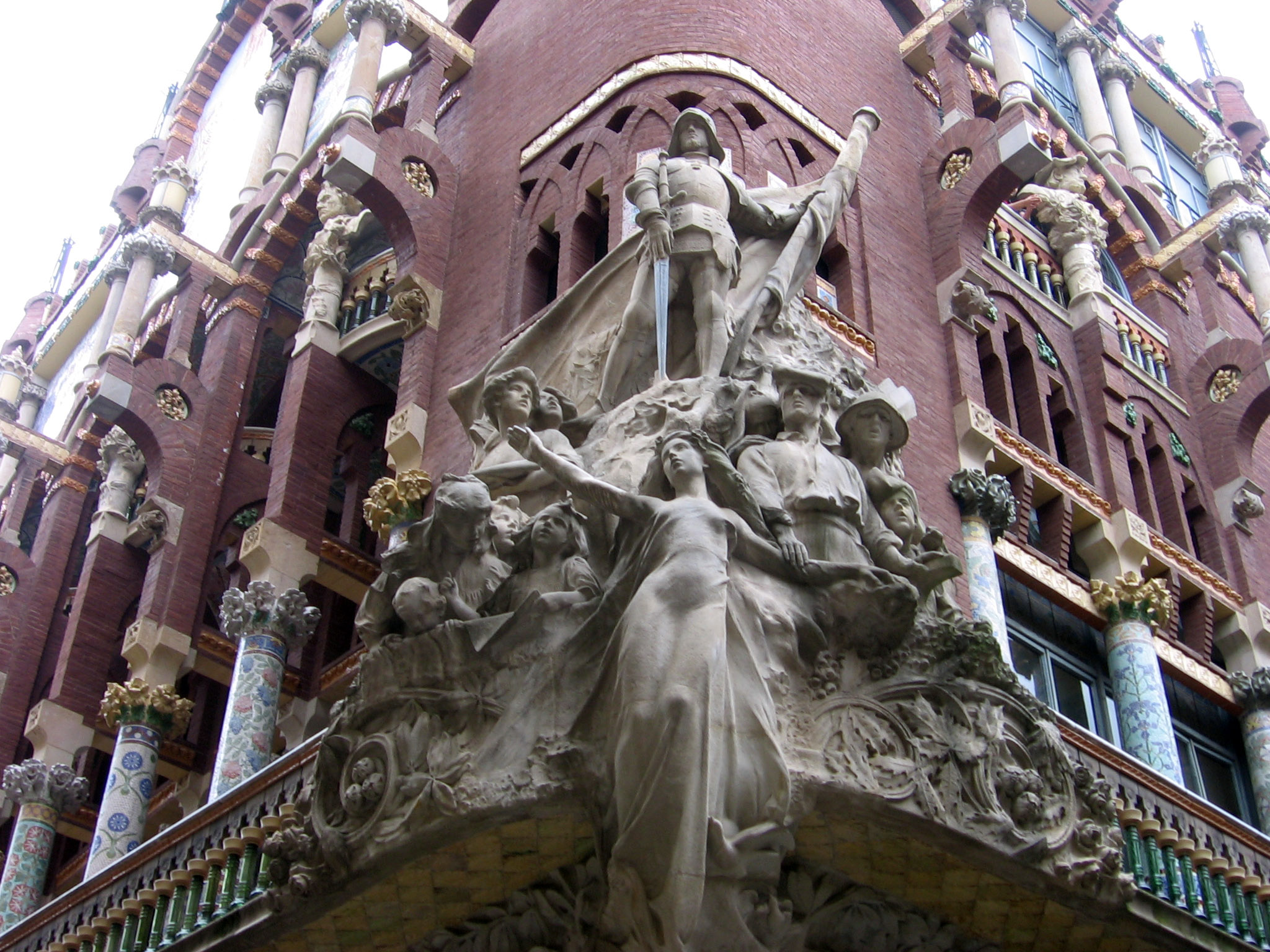
La cançó popular (1909) by Miquel Blay, Palau de la Música Catalana

The twentieth century saw the continued placement of monuments in public spaces of Barcelona, following the custom started with the celebration of the Universal Exhibition. This was the century that saw the largest number of works placed on the public roads of the city. It is noteworthy that during the turn of the century the city expanded, incorporating several neighbouring municipalities that became new districts of Barcelona: Sants-Montjuïc, Les Corts, Sant Gervasi de Cassoles, Gràcia, Sant Andreu de Palomar and Sant Martí de Provençals in 1897, Horta in 1904 and Sarrià in 1921. The political situation in the twentieth century was tumultuous, with the end of the monarchy in 1931 and the arrival of the Second Republic, the Civil War and Francoist Spain, the restoration of the monarchy and the arrival of democracy. The century saw the influx of immigrants to the city, with a consequent increase in the population: from 530,000 in 1900 to 1,009,000 in 1930, reaching a maximum of 1,754,900 between 1970 and 1980. The population at the end of the century was 1,500,000.

The artistic style prevailing in the first decades of the century was the twentieth century, in contrast to modernism promoted the return to classical Greco-Roman culture, the Mediterranean world. during the 1920s and 1930s were going introducing flows avant-garde international, although in the early years of Francoist Spain saw a return to styles academicism. Later bet again for innovation, especially with the advent of democracy, the artistic atmosphere was introduced fully in successive fashion styles internationally, which have been happening ever more quickly. They then added the public patrimony works of international artists, which has awarded the most prestigious and important public collection in the city.

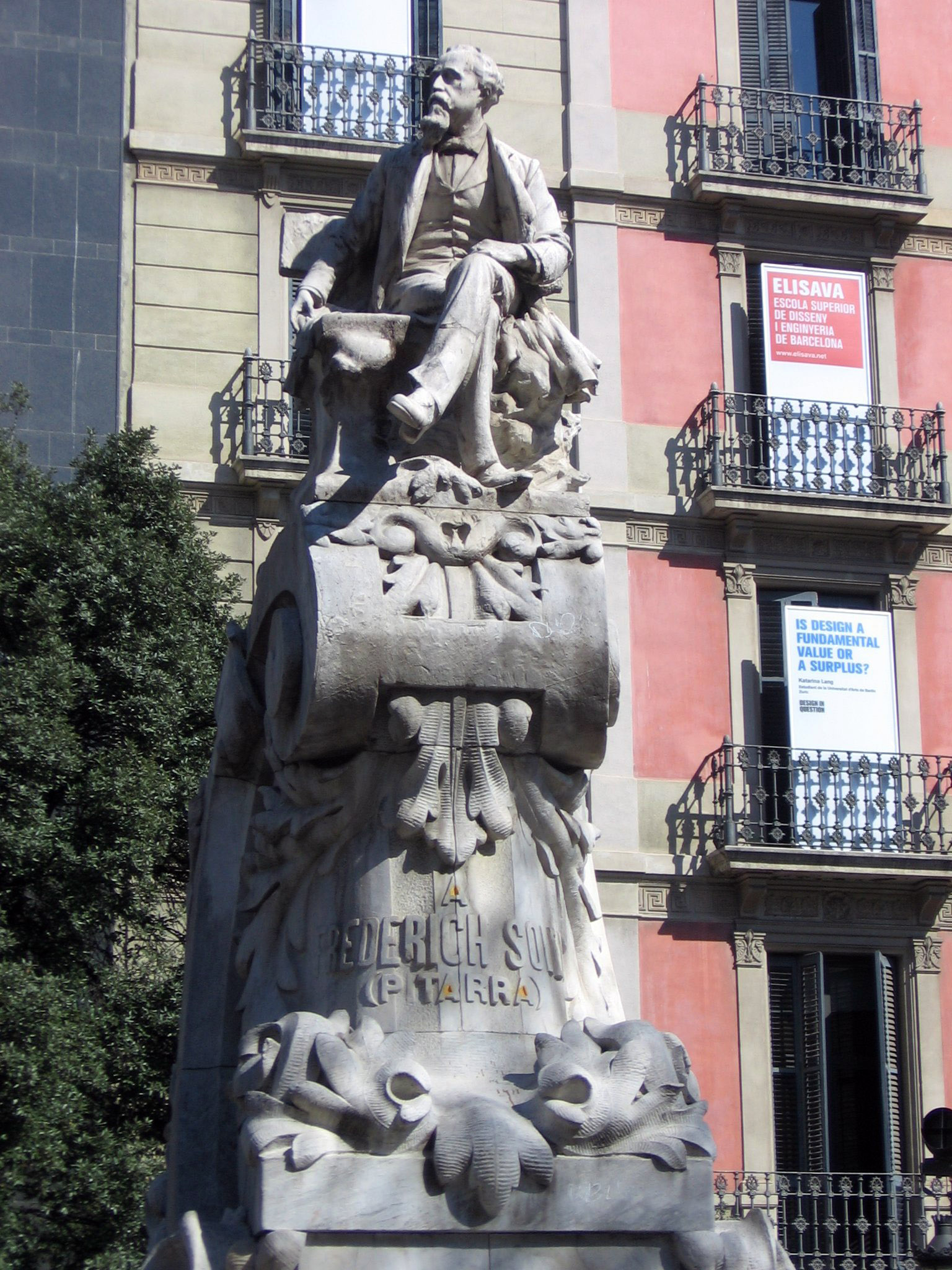
Monument to Pitarra (1906), by Agustín Querol, Theater Square.

Among the earliest twentieth-century monuments is the statue of Saint James (1903) by Manuel Fuxà, which is in a niche in Plaça de Sant Jaume. The 1906 monument to the writer Seraph Pitarra (who used the pseudonym Frederic Soler) in Pla del Teatre by Pere Falqués and Agustí Querol has the inscription fundador del teatre català (Founder of Catalan Theater), and includes the masks of comedy and tragedy. That same year realized Falqués lamps Passeig de Gràcia and Plaça del Cinc d'Oros -now Plaza Juan Carlos I, although the lights are currently at Avenida Gaudí, made of iron and limestone, the first inverted L-shaped benches to sit, and the latter in the form of vertical root Gothic pinnacle. The following year he settled in a niche of the street Montsió a figure of Saint Joseph the Patriarch, the work of Josep Llimona destroyed in 1936 and rebuilt in 2000 by Louis Cera. The same year, placed in the Parc de la Ciutadella, Mammoth a replica of the extinct animal made of concrete, the first use of this material in the city, work of Michael Dalmau. In 1908 they placed two busts dedicated to Manuel Milà i Fontanals (work of Manuel Fuxà) and Emili Vilanova (from Pere Carbonell) in the Parc de la Ciutadella, which opened a custom that would be repeating coming years of dedication busts of various characters, mostly literate thanks to the sponsorship of the association of Floral Games – the park that hosted the Universal Exhibition; so were going happening busts dedicated to Marian Aguilo (Eusebio Arnau, 1909), Victor Balaguer (Manuel Fuxà, 1910), Leon Fontova (Pau Gargallo, 1910), Teodor Llorente (Eusebio Arnau, 1912), Joan Maragall (Eusebi Arnau, 1913), Joaquim Vayreda (Manuel Fuxà, 1915), Pepita Weaver (Manuel Fuxà, 1917) -the first monument dedicated to a woman- and Ramon Batlle (Henry Clarasó, 1918 now disappeared).

In the Palau de la Música Catalana, an exceptional Modernist building by Lluis Domenech i Montaner, the La cançó popular sculpture was placed in 1909, in the corner between Sant Pere More Alt and Amadeu Vives. A work by Miquel Blay, it presents a female figure that personifies the song, surrounded by various characters representing the Catalan people, while above stands the imposing figure of St. George, with a sword and a banner.

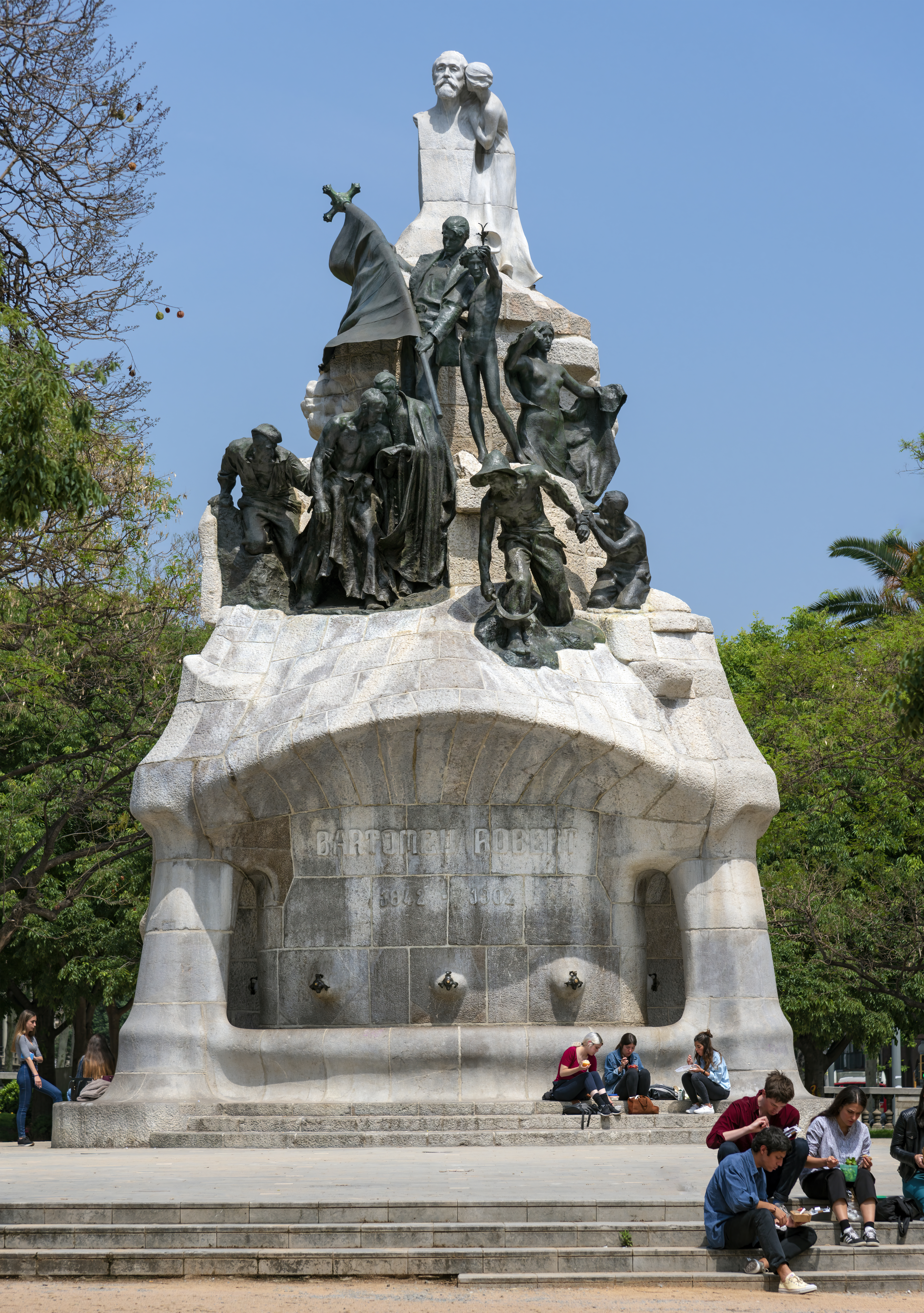
Monument to Doctor Robert (1910) by Josep Llimona, Plaza de Tetuan

The Monument al Doctor Robert was inaugurated in 1910, dedicated to the Catalan politician Bartomeu Robert, who was Mayor of Barcelona between March and October 1899. The monument is the work of the sculptor Josep Llimona i Bruguera and the architect Lluis Domenech i Montaner. The site chosen was Plaça de la Universitat, where the foundation stone was laid in 1904. In 1940 the monument was removed by the Francoist authorities and stored in a municipal warehouse. In 1977 the monument was re-erected in Plaça de Tetuan. The monument is pyramidal in form, on a base of stone blocks forms and reflects the designs of the architect Antoni Gaudí at the time, such as the Casa Milà. The front-facing sculptural group of cast bronze presents a series of figures from various social classes, allegorical figures of music and poetry and references to medicine. The monument is topped with a bust of Dr. Robert with an allegory of Glory. At the rear is another group of figures around a central figure representing medicine.

During 1910, the Eixample Commission organized competitions to design fountains for the new Eixample district. In 1911 the winner was Joseph Campeny, three of whose fountains were erected: Trinxa at the junction of Ronda Universitat and Pelai; Granota (Frog) at Còrsega and Diagonal; and El noi dels càntirs (The boy of the pitchers) in the Plaza Urquinaona. Edward B. Alentorn won in 1913, and three of his fountains were erected the Font de la Pagesa in Plaça Letamendi; the Font de la Tortuga (Turtle Fountain) in Plaça de Goya; and Font de la Palangana (or Negrito) Palangana Fountain (or Negrito) and Bruc and Diagonal. One fountain was erected in 1920, Font de la Sardana by Frederic Marès, in the Plaça de Tetuan. In 1921, the Font de la Caputxeta by Joseph Tenas was erected at Passeig Sant Joan / Rosselló; In 1924, the Font de l'Efeb by Angel Tarrach at Diagonal / Bailen; and, lastly, in 1925, two fountains by Frederic Marès: the Gall (rooster) in Plaça del Gall; and the Ànec (Duck) at València / Enamorats. Another fountain from this period is Diana (1919) by Venanci Vallmitjana, located in the Gran Via with Roger de Llúria; the sculptor had originally made a naked figure of the goddess of hunting in 1898, but when commissioned for the fountain required it to be covered with a robe.

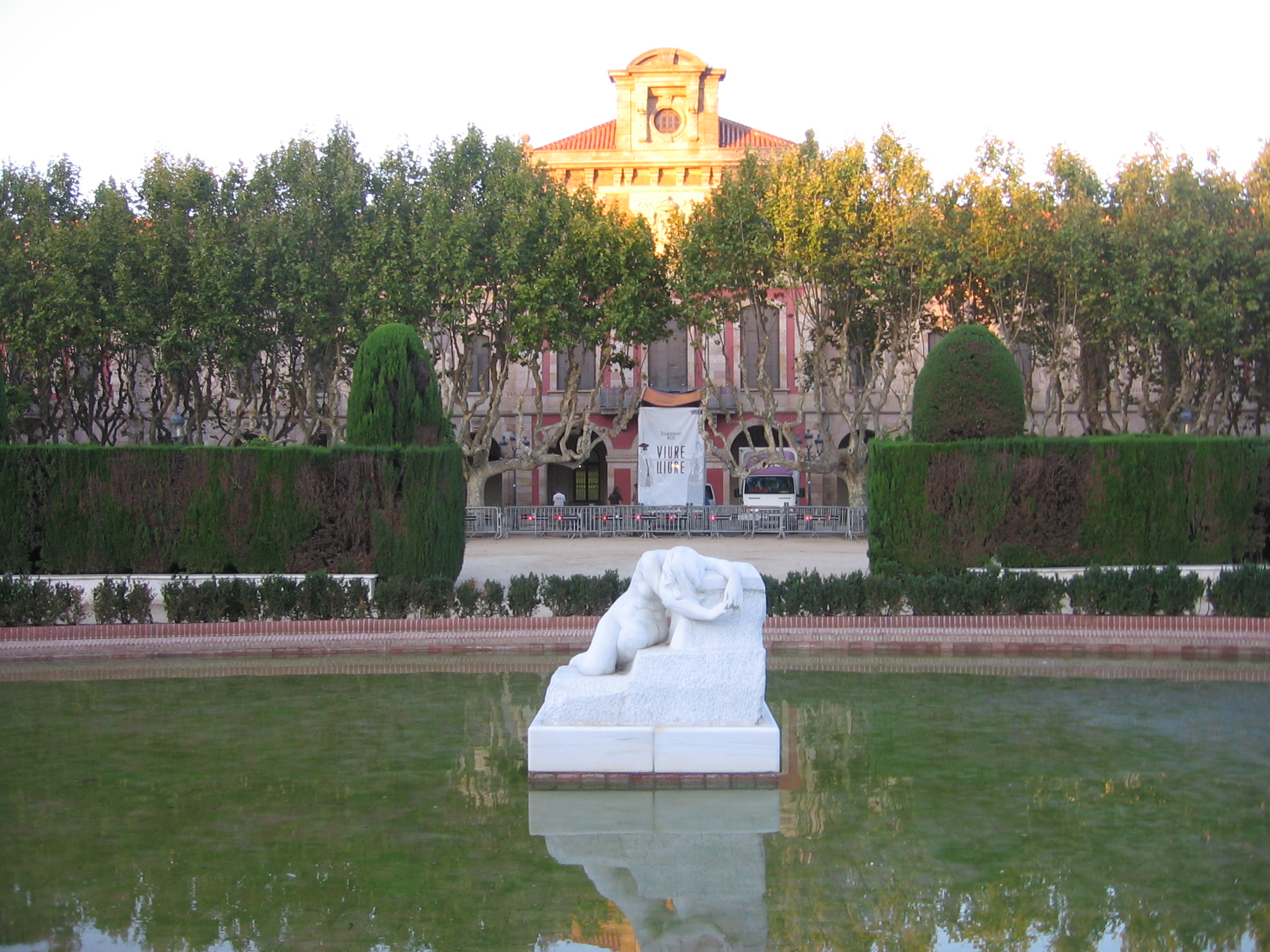
Desolation (1903) by Josep Llimona, Parc de la Ciutadella

In 1917, he moved to the Parc de la Ciutadella -in what had been an ancient sculpture courtyard armes- Grief of Josep Llimona, the center of an elliptical pond located in front of the old military arsenal today hosts the Parliament of Catalonia. The work, originally made in 1903, has become an emblem of the city. It is a figure lying half-naked woman, his head between his arms, in an attitude of despair, as its title indicates. In 1984, he moved to the original Museu Nacional d'Art de Catalunya (MNAC), and instead they placed a copy.

In the following years, were opened several other monuments dedicated to characters: 1918 erected the Monument to the actor Iscle Soler, the work of Pau Gargallo, in the Plaza de San Agustin. The following year stood at Clot the Monument Canonge Rodo in memory of the man who was rector of St. Martin, the first public work of Frederic Marès, a prolific sculptor in subsequent years; the work was destroyed in 1936 and replaced by another from the same author in 1954. Opened in 1924, Monument Father Verdaguer, in the square of the same name, dedicated to the priest and writer, one of the main writers in the Catalan language in the nineteenth century. The idea of erecting a monument to the famous poet arose after his death in 1902, but did not crystallize until 1913, when he won a competition sculptor Joan Borrell Nicholas, in conjunction with the architect Josep Maria Pericas. Borrell charge of the figure of the poet and the balustrade -three allegorical figures, alluding to the mystical poetry, popular and epic – while the brothers Michael and Lucian Oslé finalists, is in charge of the relief of the base, with scenes of the poem Atlantis author Catalan.

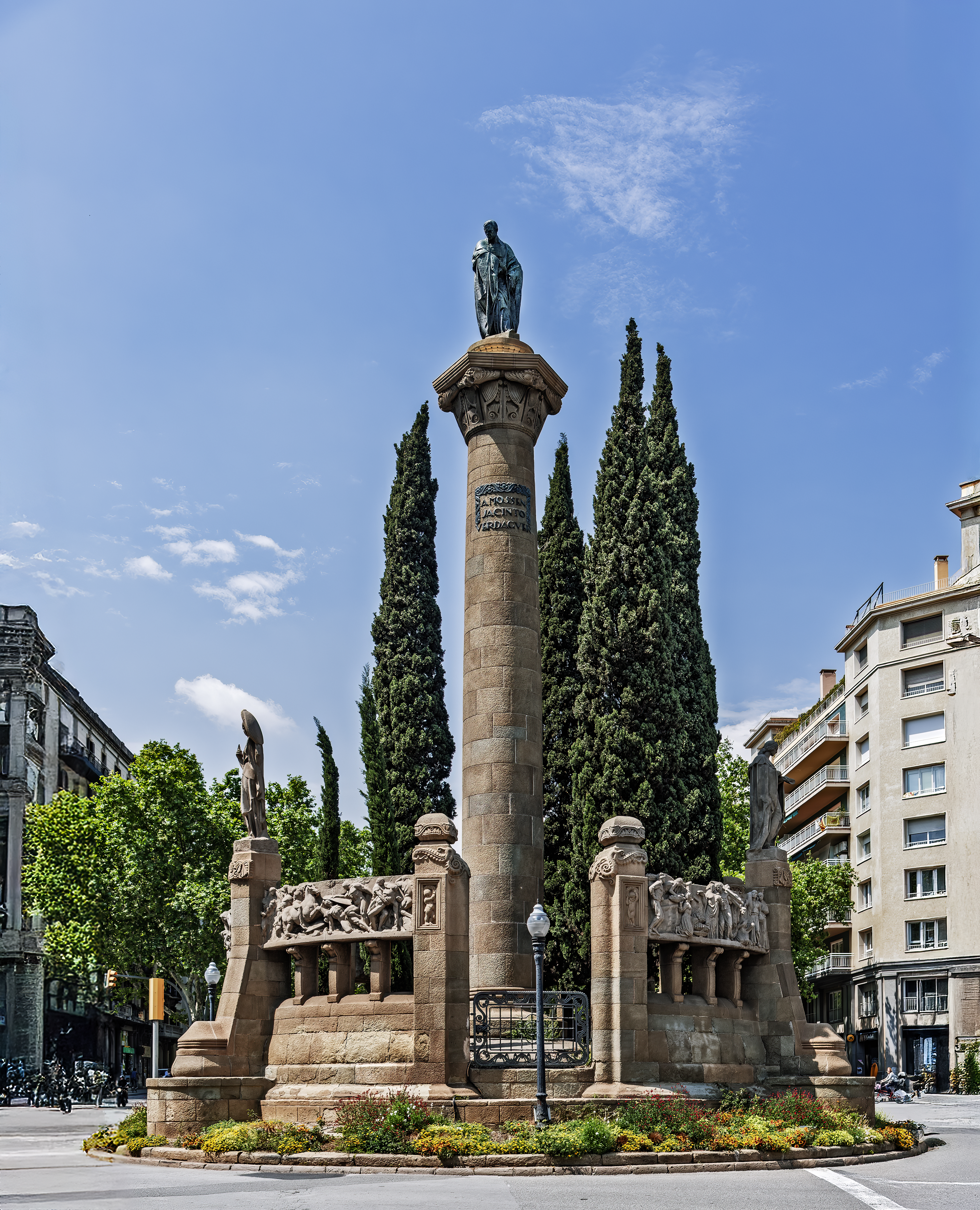
Monument Jacint Verdaguer (1924), in the homonymous square of Joan Borrell i Nicolau.

Other monuments made the 1920 were: In Doctor Andreu (1927), in honor of chemist Salvador Andreu, promoting the development of the Tibidabo who was made a first monument with effigy of the honoree, the work of Enrique Sagnier and Eusebio Arnau, which was destroyed during the Civil War, in 1952 and replaced by a statue of woman wearing robes and carrying traditional hand a laurel branch, developed by Maria Llimona; A Pearson (1928), a monument in the form of allegory Victory dedicated to the American engineer Fred Stark Pearson, promoter of the electrical industry in Catalonia, by Josep Viladomat located in the Plaza de Pedralbes, Durán the aviator (1928), the sculptor Jaime Duran in memory of the ship lieutenant Juan Manuel Durán pilot of Plus Ultra, the first plane made a transatlantic flight without scales, died in plane crash in Montjuïc, where he placed his monument, shaped Victory alada; and Source Aurora (1929), by Joan Borrell initially located at Passeig de Gracia and subsequently disintegrated into several pieces scattered around different parts: the chariot of Helios in the Turó Parc Selene Vallcarca Avenue, Minerva on Montjuïc, a Nymph combing her hair on the Plaza Joaquim Folguera, and the eagles Zoo.

This time there are several private gardens initially then incorporated in the municipal property, such as Park Guell, located on the southern slope of the Carmel Hill, the Gracia district. Designed as urbanization, was designed by the architect Gaudí commissioned by the employer Eusebio Guell and built between 1900 and 1914. He spent 1926 on public property. highlights from the park entrance staircase, arranged symmetrically around a sculpture of salamander, or dragon – which has become the emblem of the park and one of recognizable in the city, and is part of a group of three fountains with sculptures representing the Catalan Countries (Catalonia north, French and southern Catalonia, Spanish). above the staircase stands a square or Hypostyle Hall and the Greek Theatre, which highlights a bench decorated with ceramics by Josep Maria Jujol. In 1984 the UNESCO included in the Guell Park Place Heritage "Works of Antoni Gaudí"

In District of Sarria-Sant Gervasi are the Gardens Tamarita made by Tudurí Nicolau Maria Rubio i in 1918, where in front of the main building are located four sculptures dedicated to -all less Oceania- continents, by Virginio Arias. Moreover, in 1924 the city of Barcelona gave the king Alfonso XIII the Pedralbes Royal Palace, which had belonged to the family Güell. He had a Caribbean-style mansion made by Joan Martorell, while the closure of the gardens and the farm he had commissioned Antoni Gaudí, which remains in a fountain dedicated to Hercules and the pavilions goal, including an entrance gate with a wrought iron dragon, representing side, the dragon guardian of the Golden apple, won by Hercules in his eleventh work. Between 1919 and 1924, there was a renovation to convert it to the Royal Palace, by the architects Eusebius good and Francesc Nebot. They then placed several sculptures to decorate the grounds, among which was Elizabeth II presents her son, the future King Alfonso XII in Barcelona, work of Agapito Vallmitjana 1860; or female nude kneeling by Joan Borrell in 1916. 1930 also placed a Naked of Enric Casanovas.

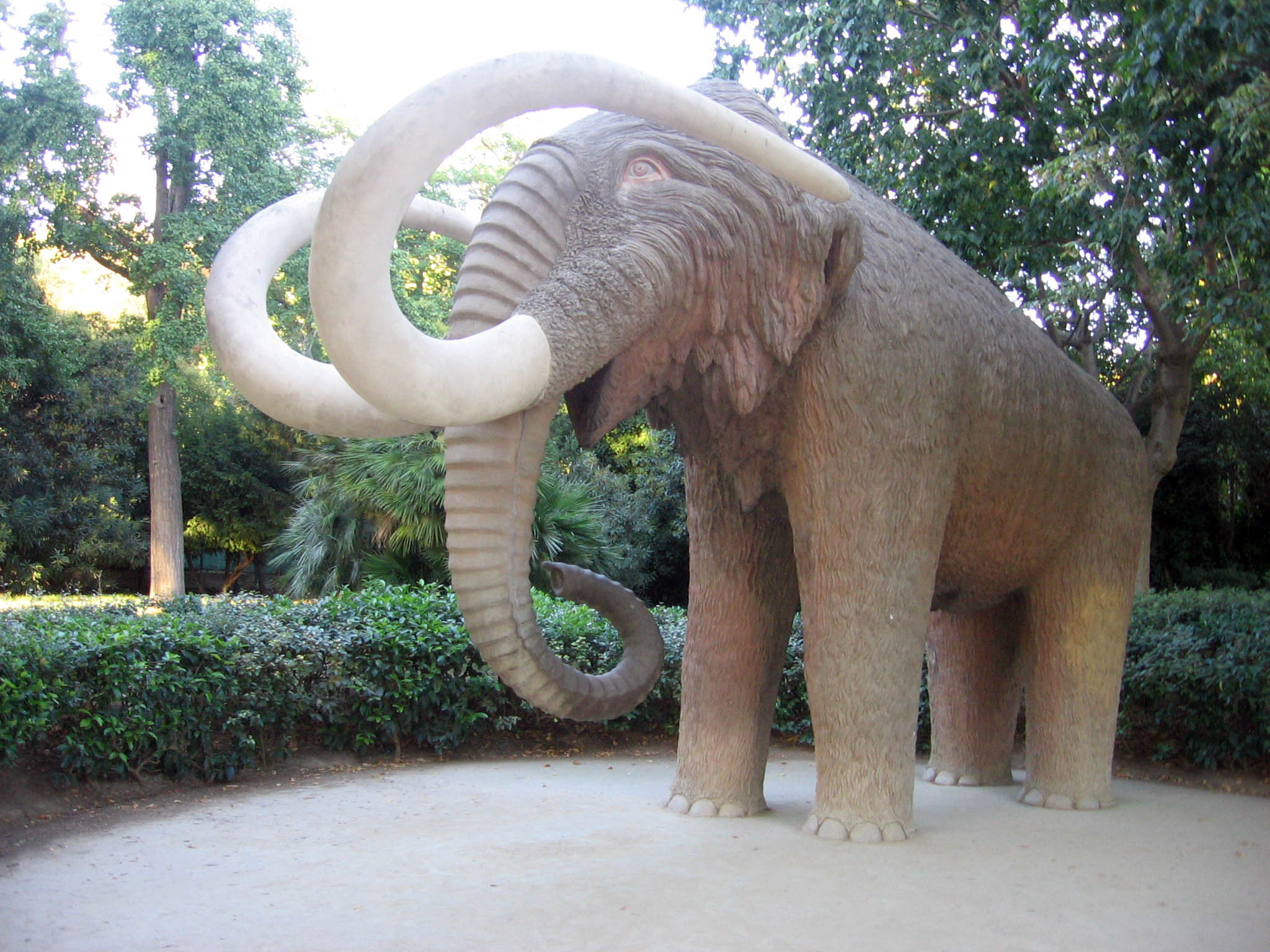
Mamut (1907), by Miquel Dalmau, Parc de la Ciutadella.

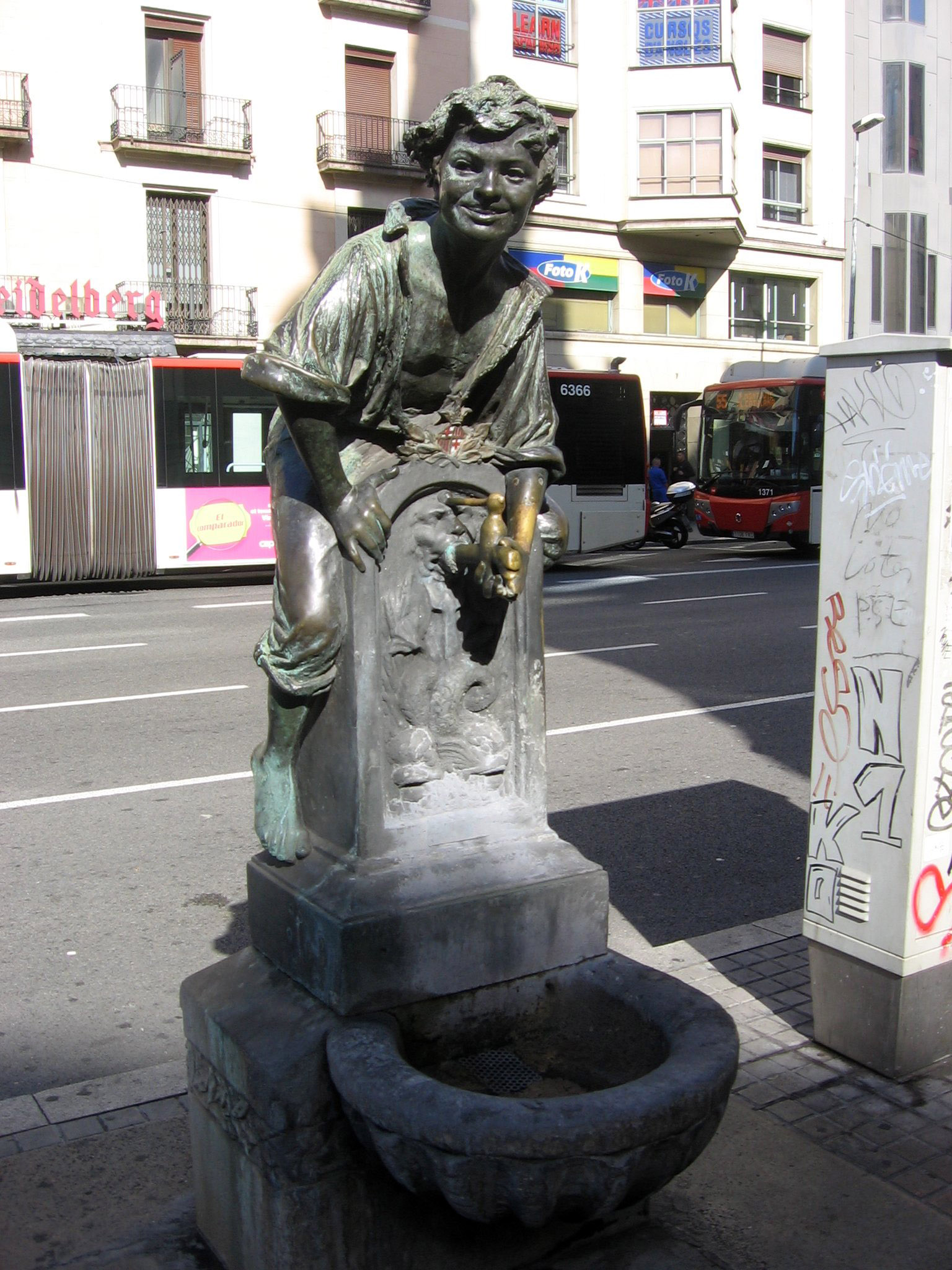
Font del Trinxa (1911), of Josep Campeny, Ronda Universitat/Pelai.

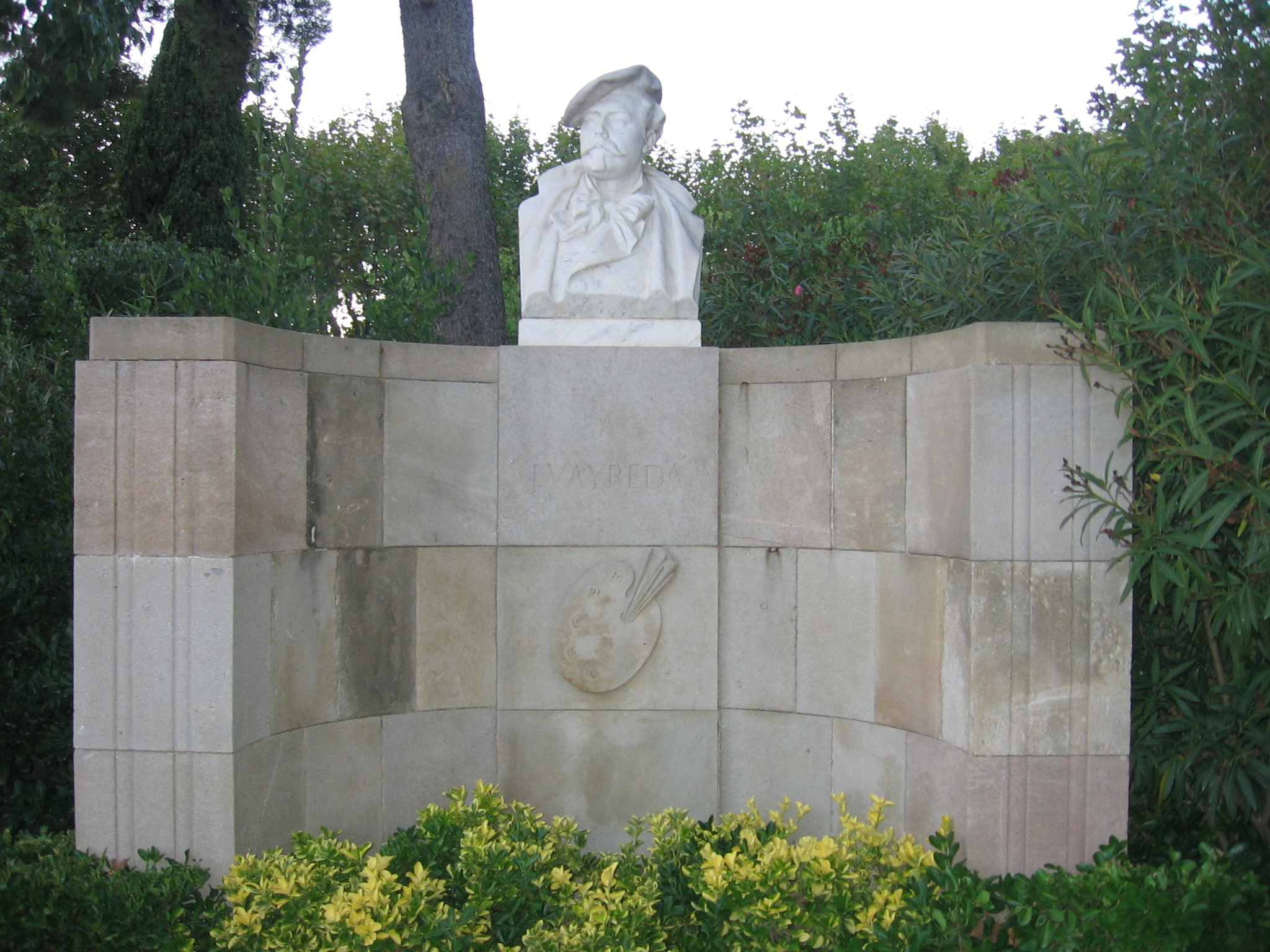
A Joaquim Vayreda (1915), by Manuel Fuxà, Parc de la Ciutadella.

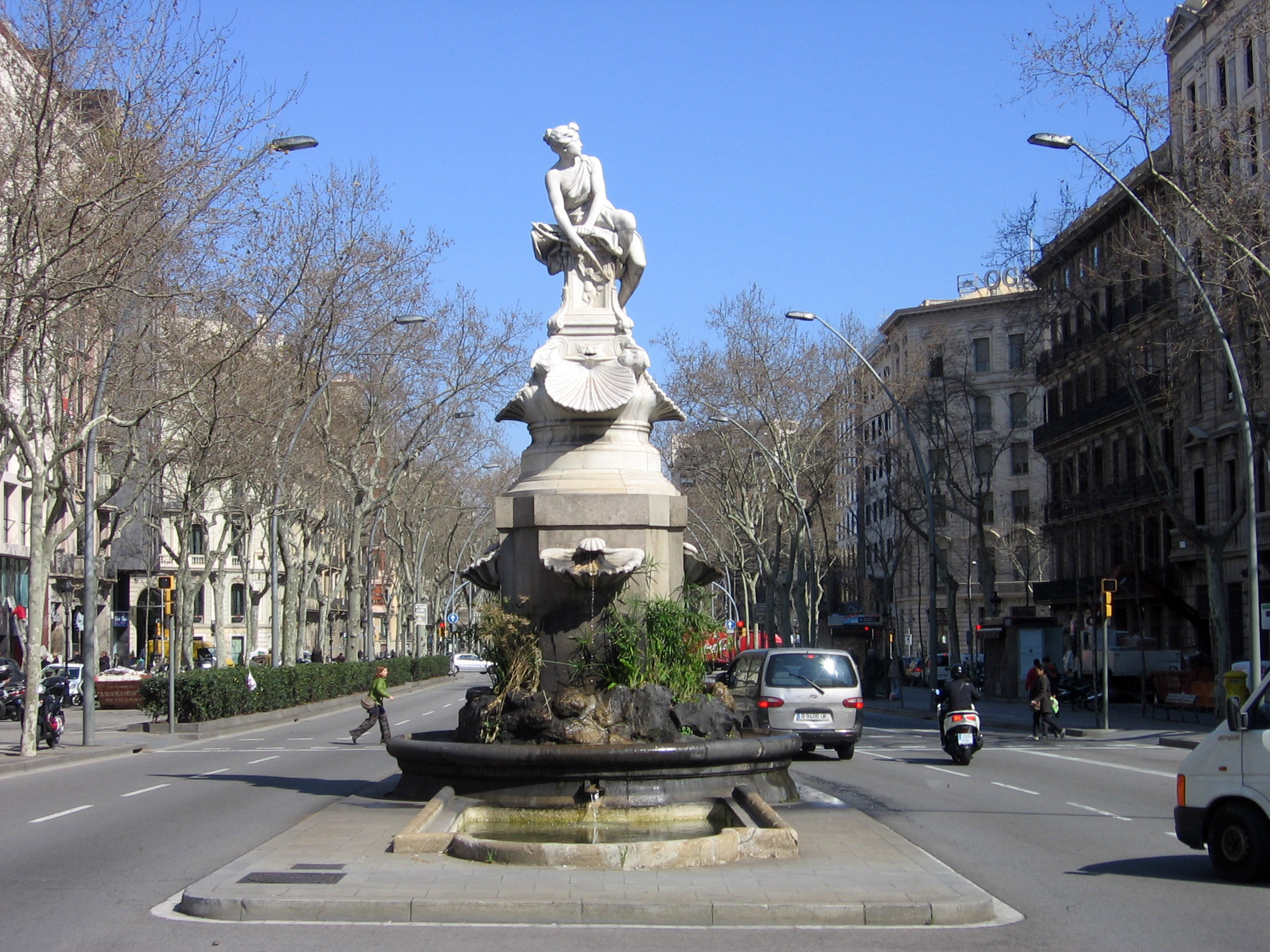
Font de Diana (1919), of Venanci Vallmitjana, Gran Via with Roger de Llúria.

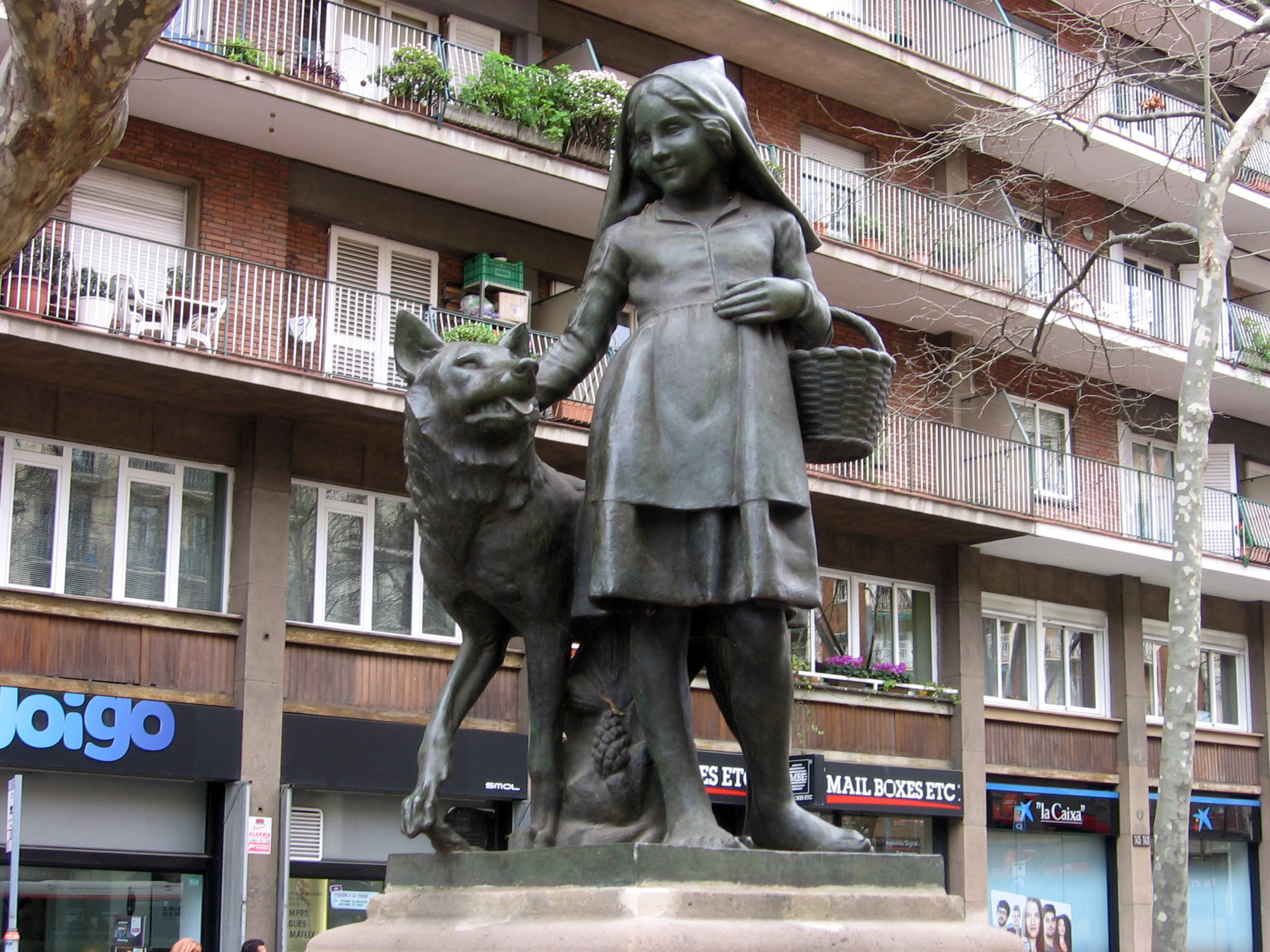
Font de la Caputxeta (1921), of Josep Tenas, Passeig de Sant Joan/Rosselló.

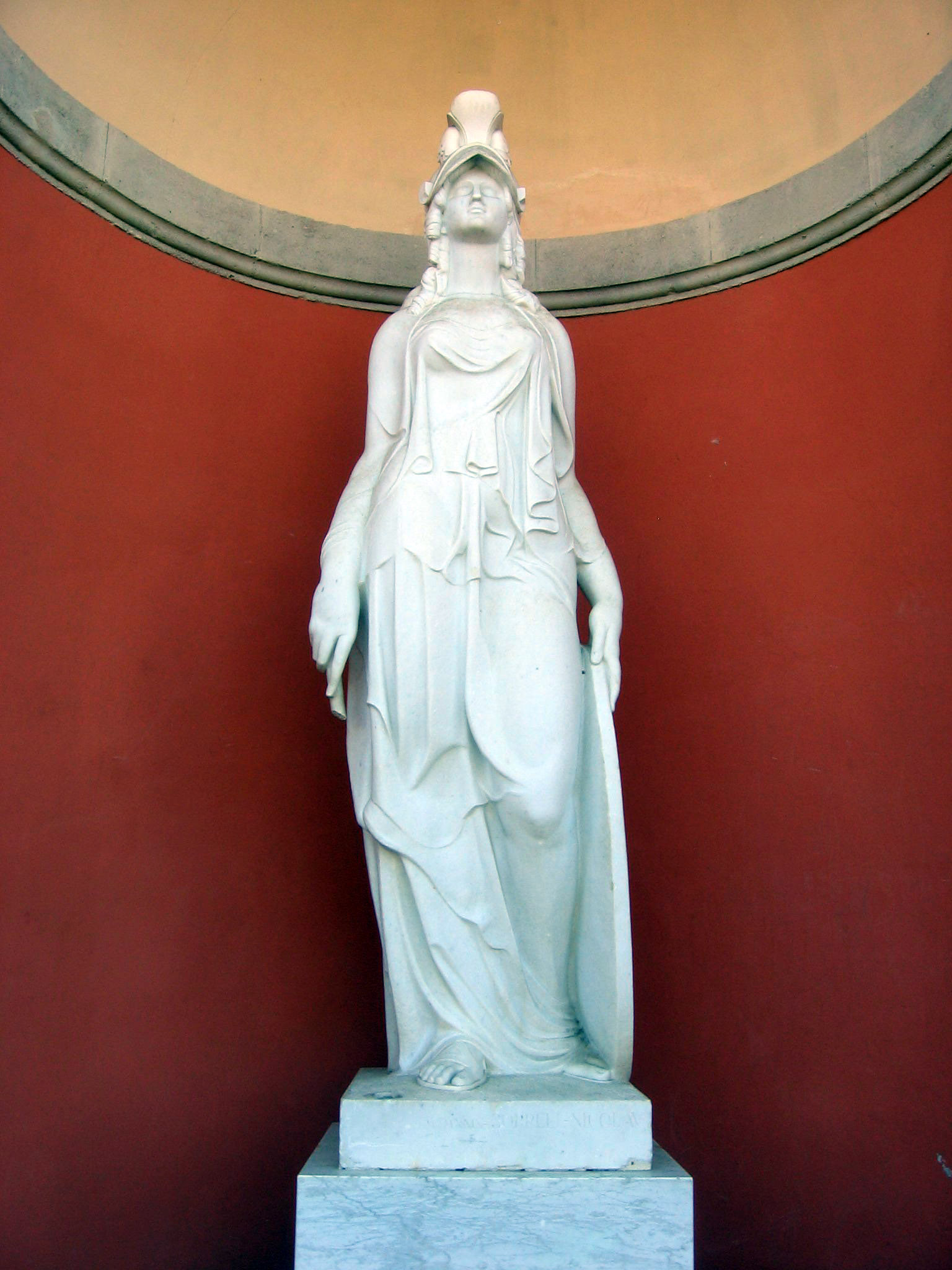
Minerva, del conjunt de la Font de l'Aurora (1929), of Joan Borrell i Nicolau, Passeig de Santa Madrona, Montjuïc.

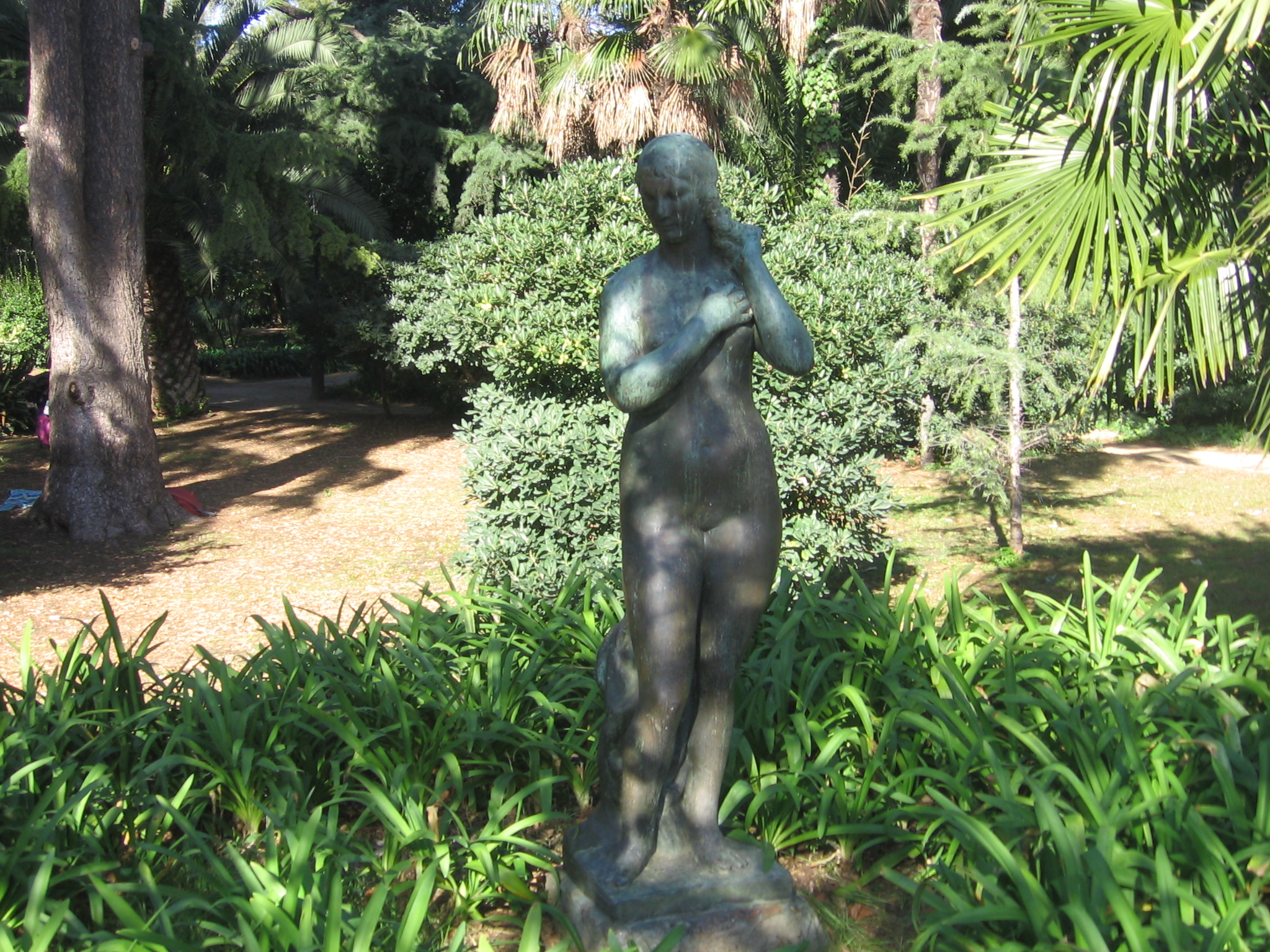
Nu (1930), of Enric Casanovas, Palau Reial de Pedralbes.

=== 1929 Barcelona International Exposition ===
In the 1920s, a new exhibition was planned like 1888, whose success left a pleasant memory in the city. This time the site chosen was the mountain of Montjuïc, which thus was urbanized and won as a public space for the city. The International Exhibition took place from 20 May 1929 to 15 January 1930, and left numerous buildings and facilities some of which have become emblems of the city, including the National Palace, Magic Fountain, the Teatre Grec, the Spanish Village and Olímpico. Stadium the venue of the exhibition was built as a general project of Josep Puig i Cadafalch, and began at the Plaza of Spain, through the avenue of America -current avenue Maria Cristina de la Reina, where large exhibition buildings were located, to the foot of the mountain, where the Magic Fountain, flanked by the palaces of Alfonso XIII and Victoria Eugenia stood; From here a staircase leading to the National Palace, the most monumental work of Exposición.

One of the most important monuments was the monumental Spain Fountain Square, designed by Josep Maria Jujol, with ornate decoration sculptural work and Miquel Miguel Blay and Llucià Oslé brothers. Classically inspired, the iconographic meaning of the work is a poetic allegory to Spain: on a pond triangular plants an edículo stands with three niches with sculptures symbolizing the rivers flowing into the three seas that surround the Iberian Peninsula, Ebro (Mediterranean), the Guadalquivir and Tajo (Atlantic) and some figures of teenagers for the rivers of the Cantabrian Sea, Blay work; at the corners of the pond three groups that represent the fruits and gifts of the waters they lie: Abundance, Public Health and Fisheries and Navigation Oslé work of the brothers; around the central body three columns are placed with various figures and emblems symbolizing religion (a cross with Ramon Llull, Saint Teresa of Avila and Ignatius of Loyola), Heroism (a sword with Don Pelayo, Jaime I of Aragon and Isabella Catholic), and the Arts (a book with Ausiàs March and Miguel de Cervantes); He tops the work a cauldron of fire with three Victorias.

Between Spain Square and the National Palace of Montjuic Magic Fountain, designed by Carles Buigas, who wowed audiences for its fantastic play of light and water spouts stood. It is still an emblematic work of the Catalan capital, where they often held musical fireworks shows in the celebrations of the Merced. It is ellipsoidal in shape, formed by three concentric ponds at different levels, with 65 m in diameter at its widest part. It has thirty different water games, with their gradual colorations, based on five colors: yellow, blue, green, red and blanco. In principle, there were built four Ionic columns symbolizing the Catalan flag, designed by Puig i Cadafalch, but the dictator Miguel Primo de Rivera sent them toppling. With the restoration of democracy was thought to replace them, project carried out between 2010 and 2011 by the team of architects Rosselló-Sangenís, slightly higher than its location original.

Other works placed on the grounds of the exhibition were: San Jorge (1924), by Josep Llimona, in the homonymous square; Beauty (1924), by Josep Llimona, in Piazza Dante; Tomorrow (1925), the German expressionist sculptor Georg Kolbe, located in the Pavilion of Germany a rationalist style building built by Ludwig Mies van der Rohe; Flowers and sedente (1927), by Josep Llimona in the Marques de Foronda; Water and Earth (1929), Frederic Marès on the stairs to the National Palace; Serenity (1928), Josep Clara in Miramar Gardens; Young Braid (1928) by Josep Viladomat, and Estival (1929), by Jaume Otero, in Laribal Gardens; The Good Shepherd (1929), Joan Rebull, and Venus (1929), Joan Borrell, in the Gardens of Joan Maragall.69 then also carried the Olympic charioteers, a chariot pulled by horses and riders making the Olympic salute two equestrian sculptures in bronze, both of Pablo Gargallo, situated at the Olympic Stadium Lluís Companys of charioteers there is a copy in the park Can Dragó-.

In addition to the achievements at the fair, as in the foregoing various performances throughout the city they were made. The most important was in Plaza Catalunya, currently one of the nerve centers of the city, but that was formerly an esplanade outside the old town, which began to urbanize until 1902. On the occasion precisely the exhibition was out a redevelopment of the entire space of the square, with a project of Francesc Nebot, and was inaugurated by Alfonso XIII in 1927, to decorate the square a public tender was organized in 1927, in which the installation of a sculpture it was decided 28 works: Motherhood, of Vincenç Navarro; Jove, by Josep Dunyach; El forjador, by Josep Llimona; Woman with child and piccolo, Josep Viladomat; female figure, of Enric Casanovas; Youth, Josep Clarà; Shepherd Flute, Pablo Gargallo; Navigation, Eusebi Arnau; Barcelona, Frederic Marès; Montserrat, Eusebi Arnau; female figure, Josep Llimona; Hercules, Antoni Parera; Woman with angel, Vincente Navarro; Tarragona, Jaume Otero; Source of six putti, Jaume Otero; Lleida, Joan Borrell; Woman with image of the Virgin, of Enric Monjo; The popular spirit, Jaume Otero; Pastor eagle, Pablo Gargallo; Pomona, Enric Monjo; Wisdom, Miquel Oslé; The Goddess of Josep Clara, currently a copy, the original is in the lobby of the House of the city; Work, Llucià Oslé; Emporion, Frederic Marès; Pescador, Josep Tenas; Dona, Joan Borrell; Montseny, by Jaume Duran; and Girona, by Antoni Parera. Originally there was also in the square the group Nens cavalcant peixos (1928), by Frederic Marès, a fountain with water jets and four figures indicating the title, which was transferred in 1961 the junction of Gran Via and Rambla de Catalunya.

With regard to the whole Plaça Catalunya, some changes on the fly in the original project led to the replacement of several parts and transfer to other areas of the city. One of the main reasons was the cancellation of the project of Francesc Nebot placed in the square a pavilion with decorated colonnade with sixteen female figures, which finally took place by the decision of the consistory, prompting the resignation of Nebot in front of the works. Thus, some of the sculptures made for this shrine were relocated in different places: four of them executed by Eusebi Arnau, Josep Llimona, Enric Casanovas and Àngel Tarrach, they were placed on the entrance wall of the Royal Palace of Pedralbes; two from Josep Dunyach (Goddess) and Vincente Navarro (night), others were installed in the park of the Citadel; and two more (Fertility, by Josep clear, and the vendimiadora, Pablo Gargallo), in the gardens of Miramar, in Montjuïc. Another reason the surplus works was the decision that all the sculptures of the square were made in bronze except those of the upper terrace, which are stone-, with the result that some works that had already been executed in stone had to be repeated, and the remaining were relocated: it is Lerida, Manuel Fuxà, and Tarragona, Jaume Otero, that were installed on Diagonal avenue, opposite the Royal Palace of Pedralbes. Finally, the work entitled Marinade or Danzarina, by Antoni Alsina was located in the Jardines del Umbráculo on Passeig de Santa Madrona of Montjuïc, in this case, because it concerns a female nude that was not viewed favorably by the moral prevailing at the time.

After the exhibition, in 1930 the monument was opened to Pau Gil, in honor of the banker who introduced the gas industry in Barcelona and with his testament favored the construction of the Hospital de Sant Pau, a jewel of modernism made by Lluis Domenech i Montaner, whose entrance is the monument. The work of Eusebi Arnau was held in 1916 but was not settled until 1930, and has a bust banker with an allegory of Charity at his feet. Also that year was placed on the Gran Via the monument to set designer Francesc Soler i Rovirosa, the work of Frederic Marès shaped reclining female nude with a flower in her hand; and the Monument to Eduardo Dato, on Carrer Sant Antoni Maria Claret by Jaume Duran, composed of an allegory of Fame and a monolith with a medallion of the honoree.

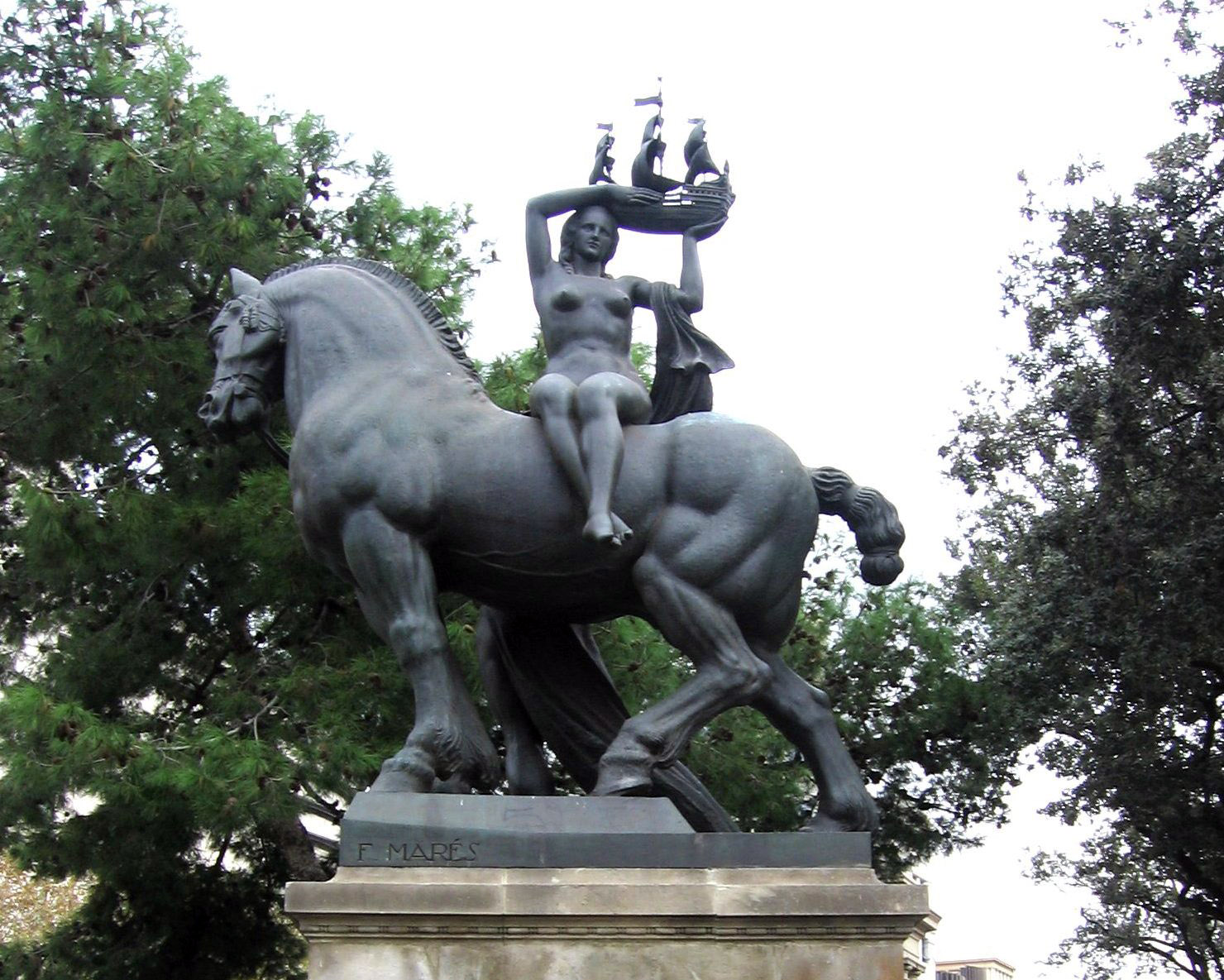
Barcelona (1928), by Frederic Marès, plaça de Catalunya.

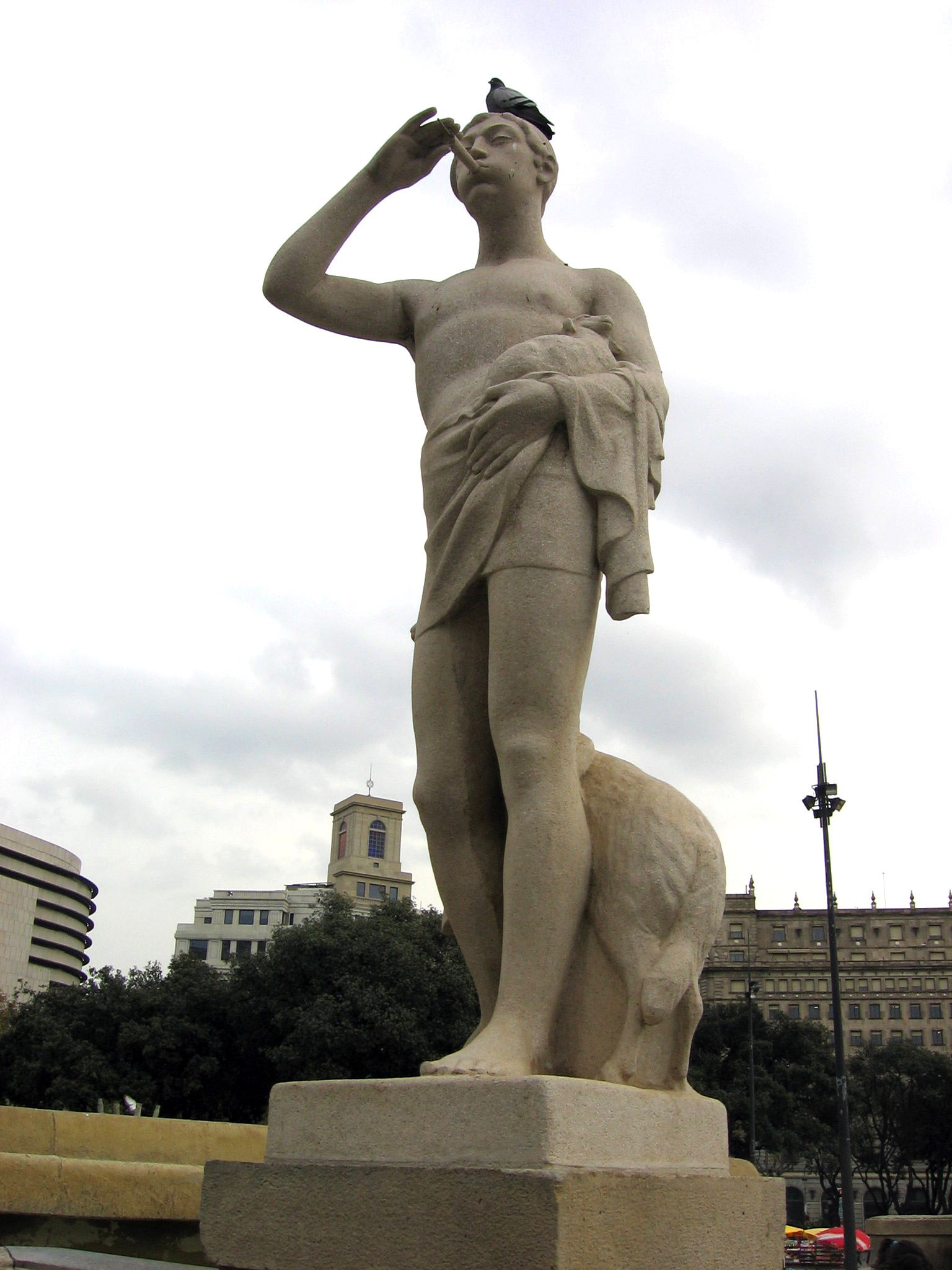
Pastor de la flauta (1928), Pablo Gargallo, plaça de Catalunya.

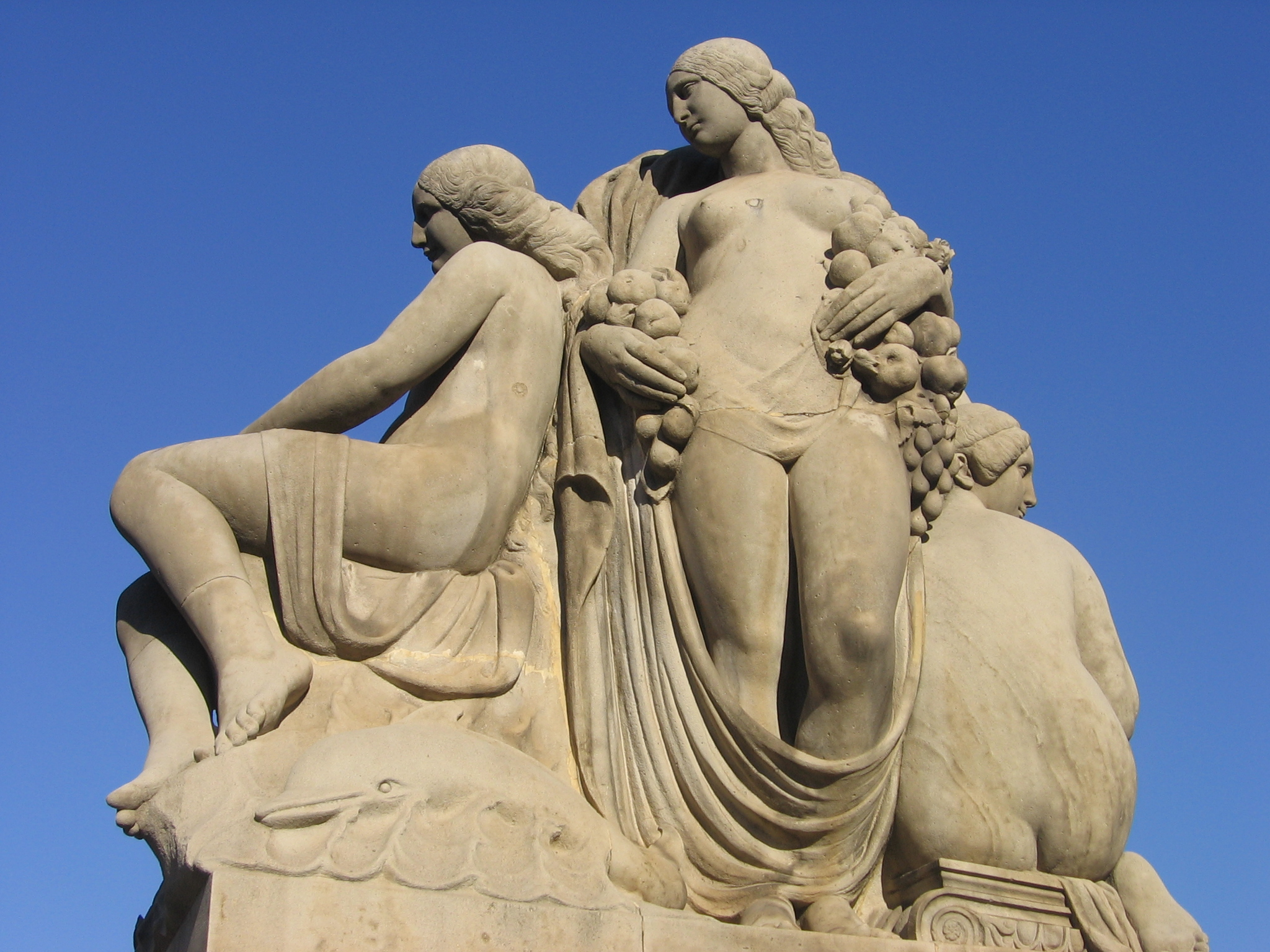
Tarragona (1928), by Jaume Otero, avinguda Diagonal.

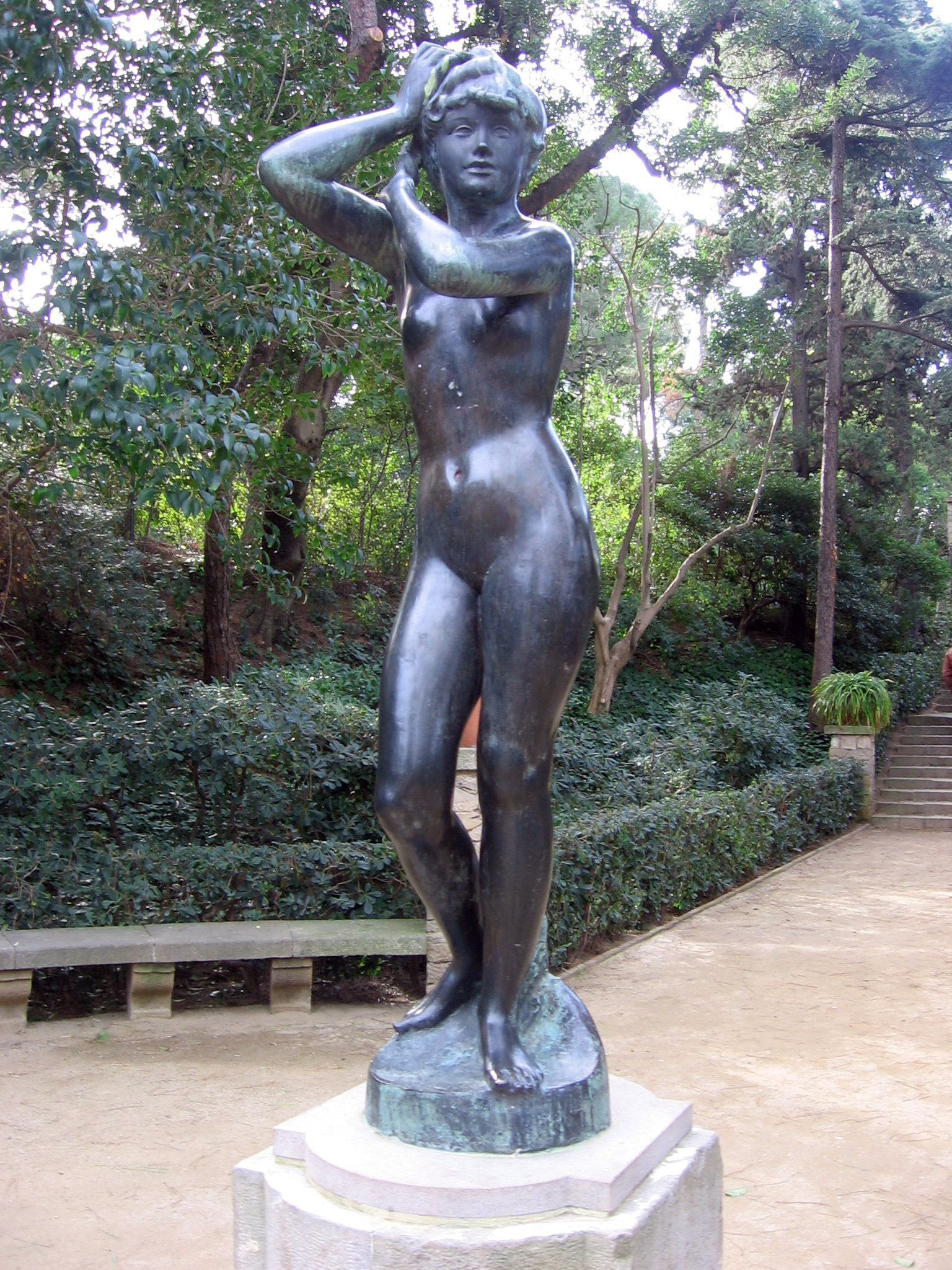
Joven de la trenza (1928), by Josep Viladomat, Jardines de Laribal.

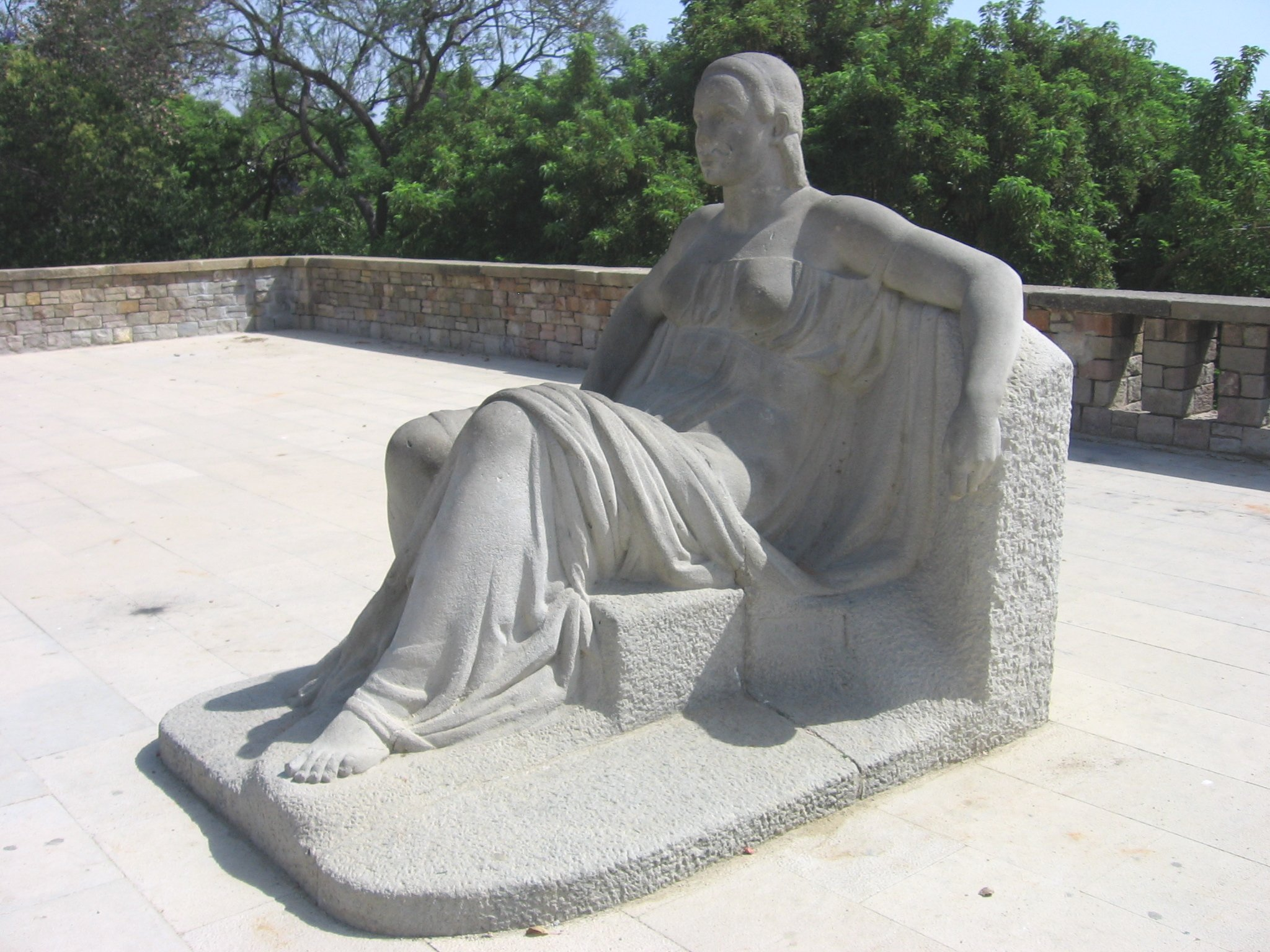
Serenidad (1928), by Josep Clarà, Jardines de Miramar.

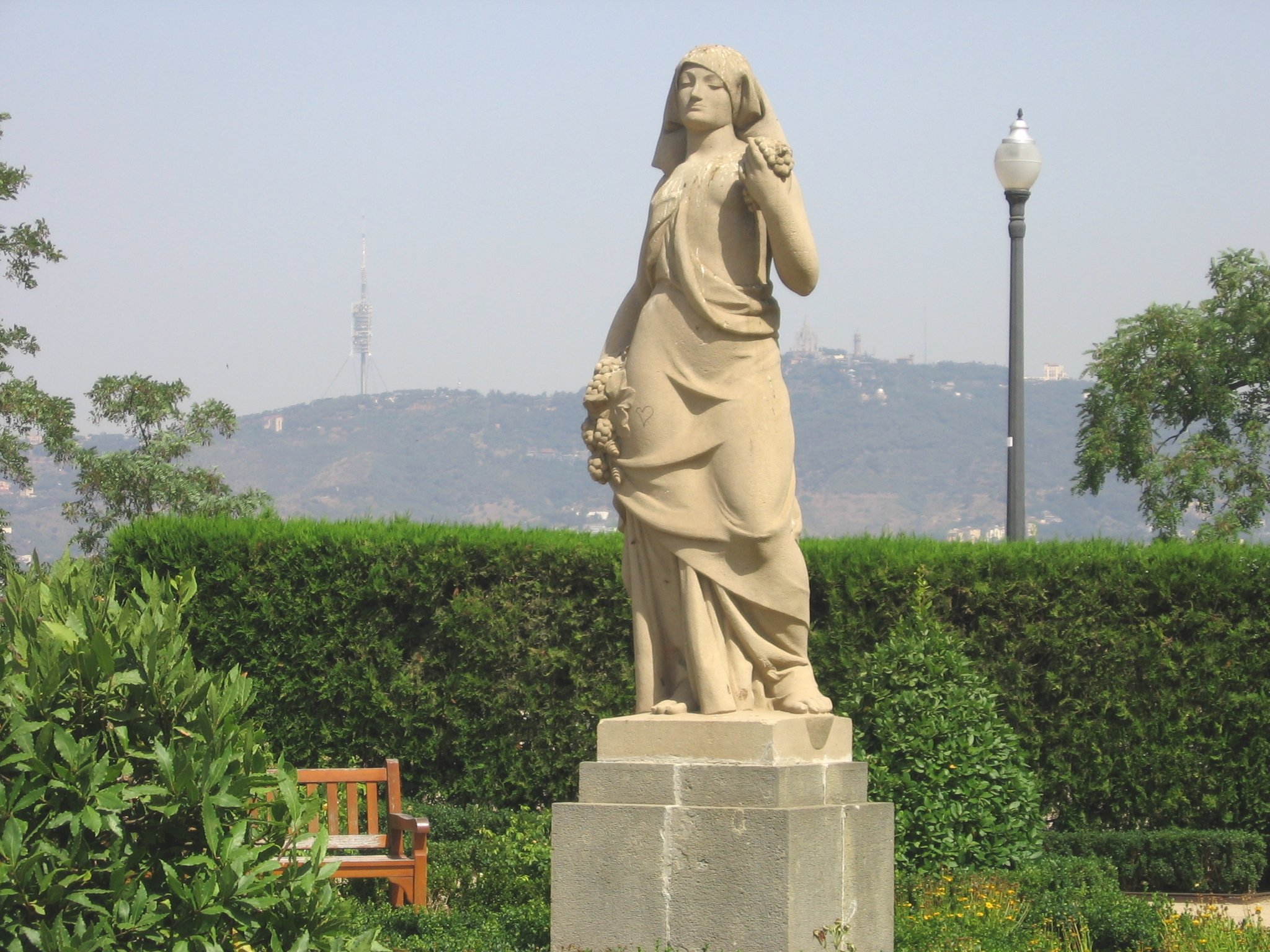
La vendimiadora (1928), by Pablo Gargallo, Jardines de Miramar.

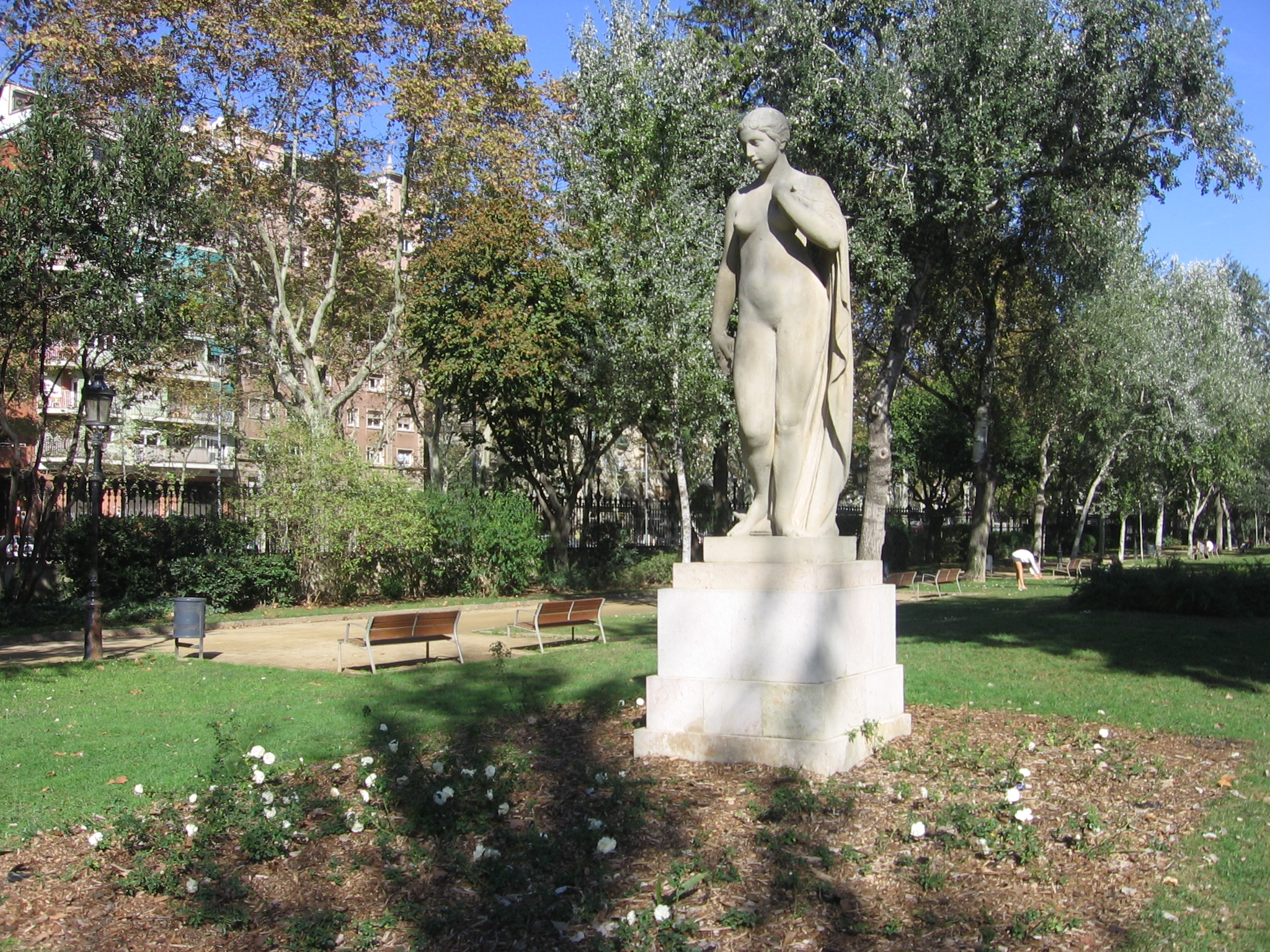
Diosa (1928), by Josep Dunyach, parc de la Ciutadella.

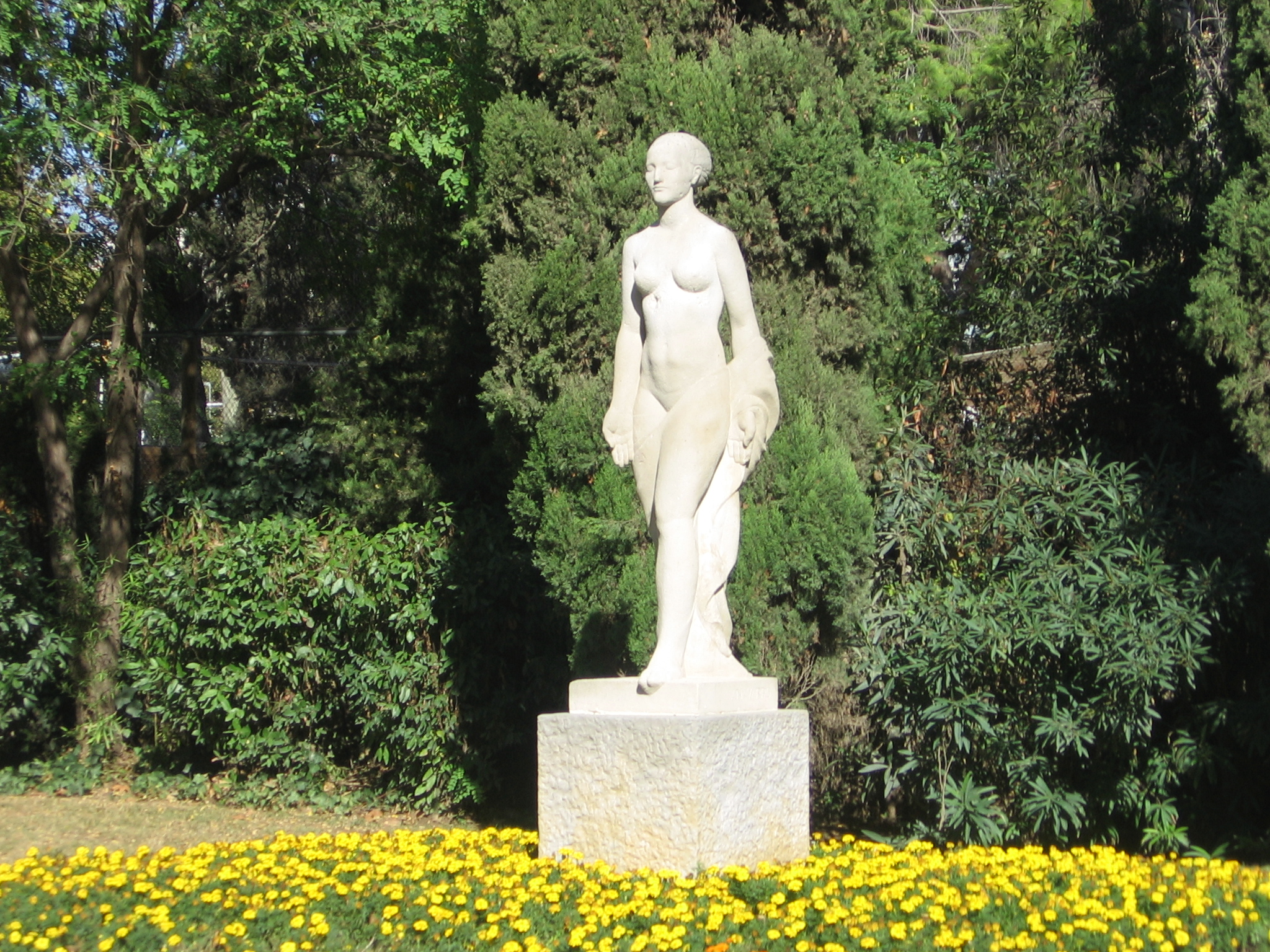
La noche (1929), by Vicenç Navarro, parc de la Ciutadella.

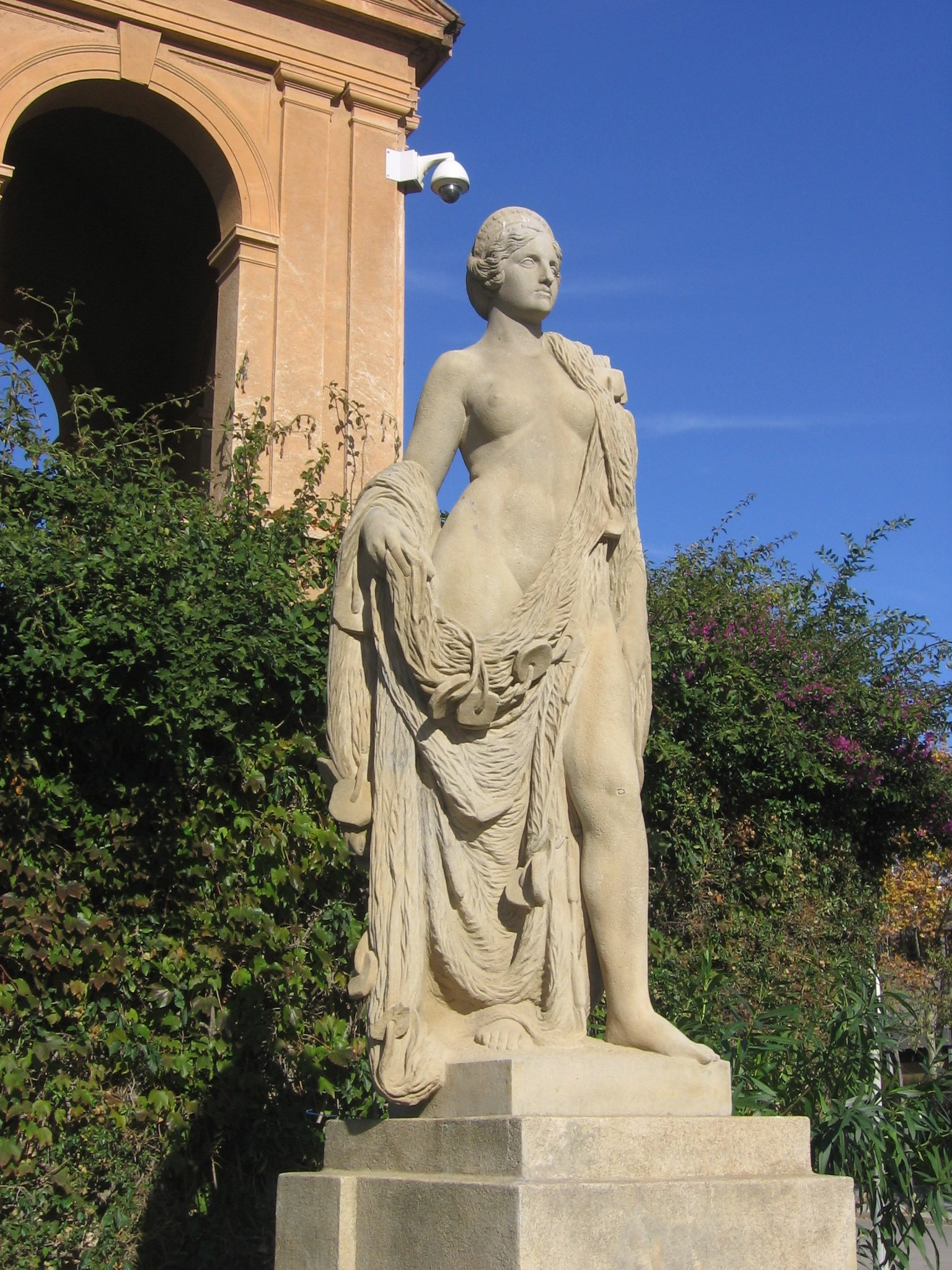
Marina (1929), de Eusebi Arnau, Palau Reial de Pedralbes.

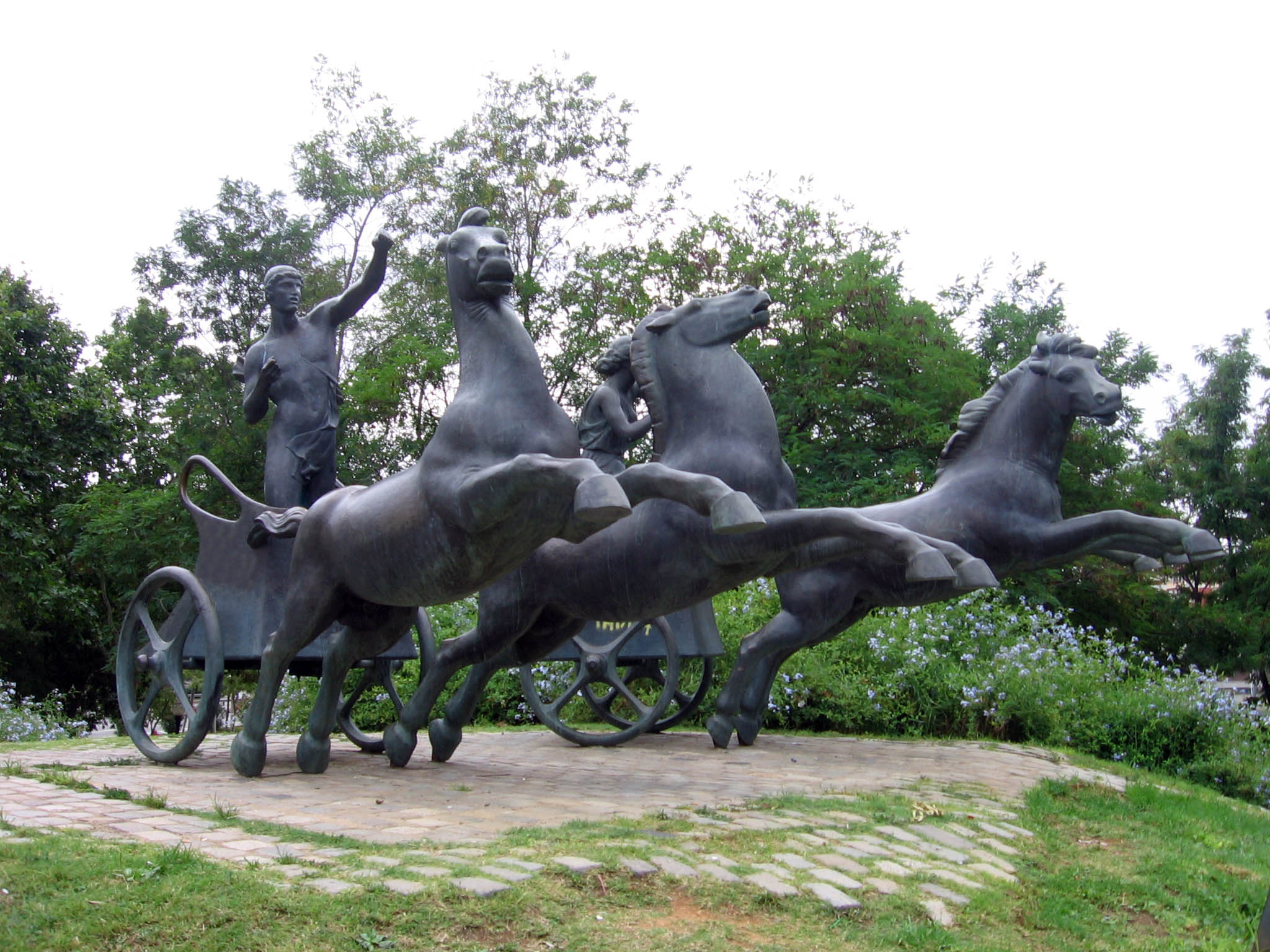
Aurigas olímpicos (1929), de Pablo Gargallo (copia en el parque de Can Dragó).

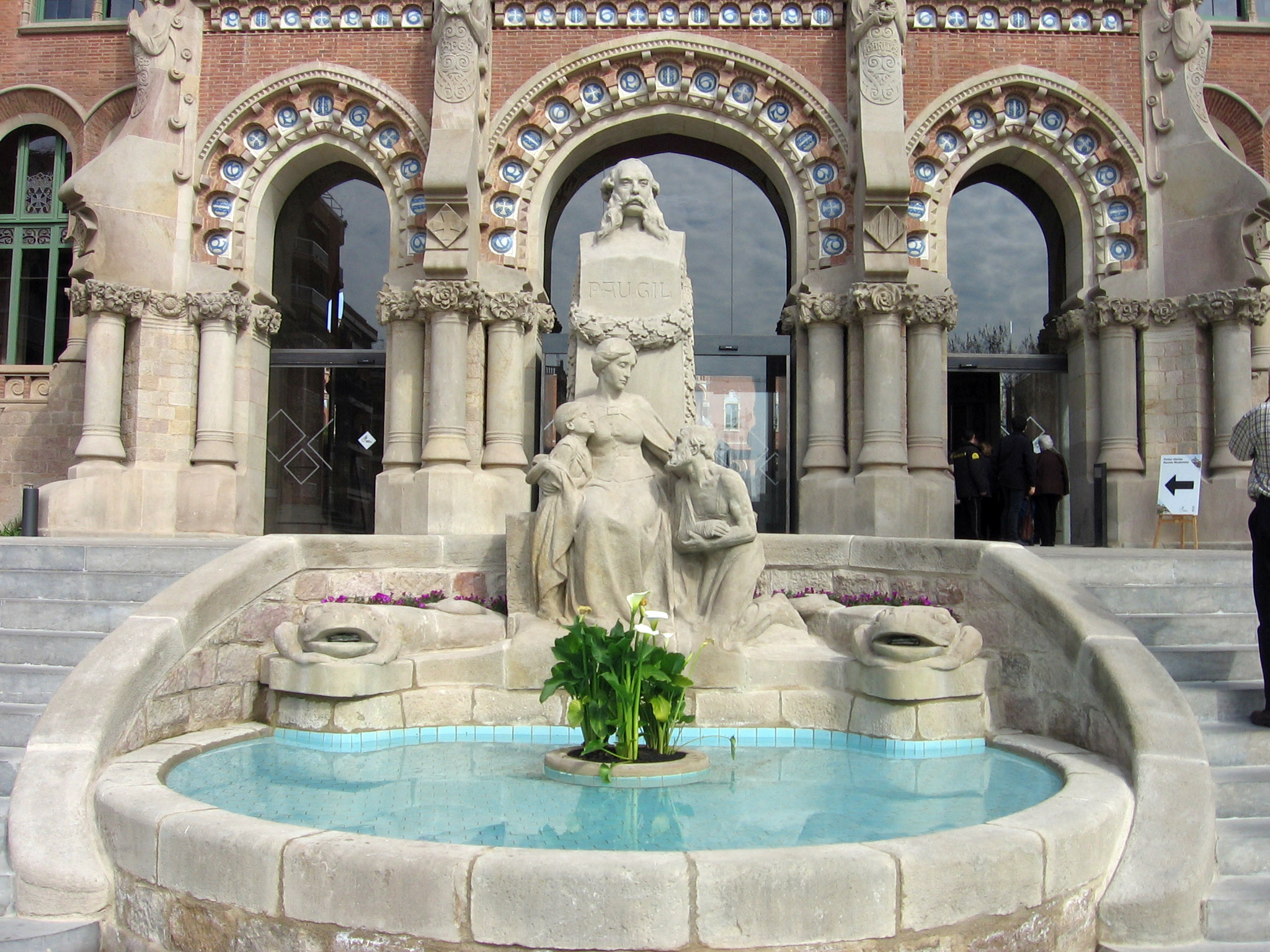
Monumento a Pau Gil (1930), byusebi Arnau, Hospital de Sant Pau.

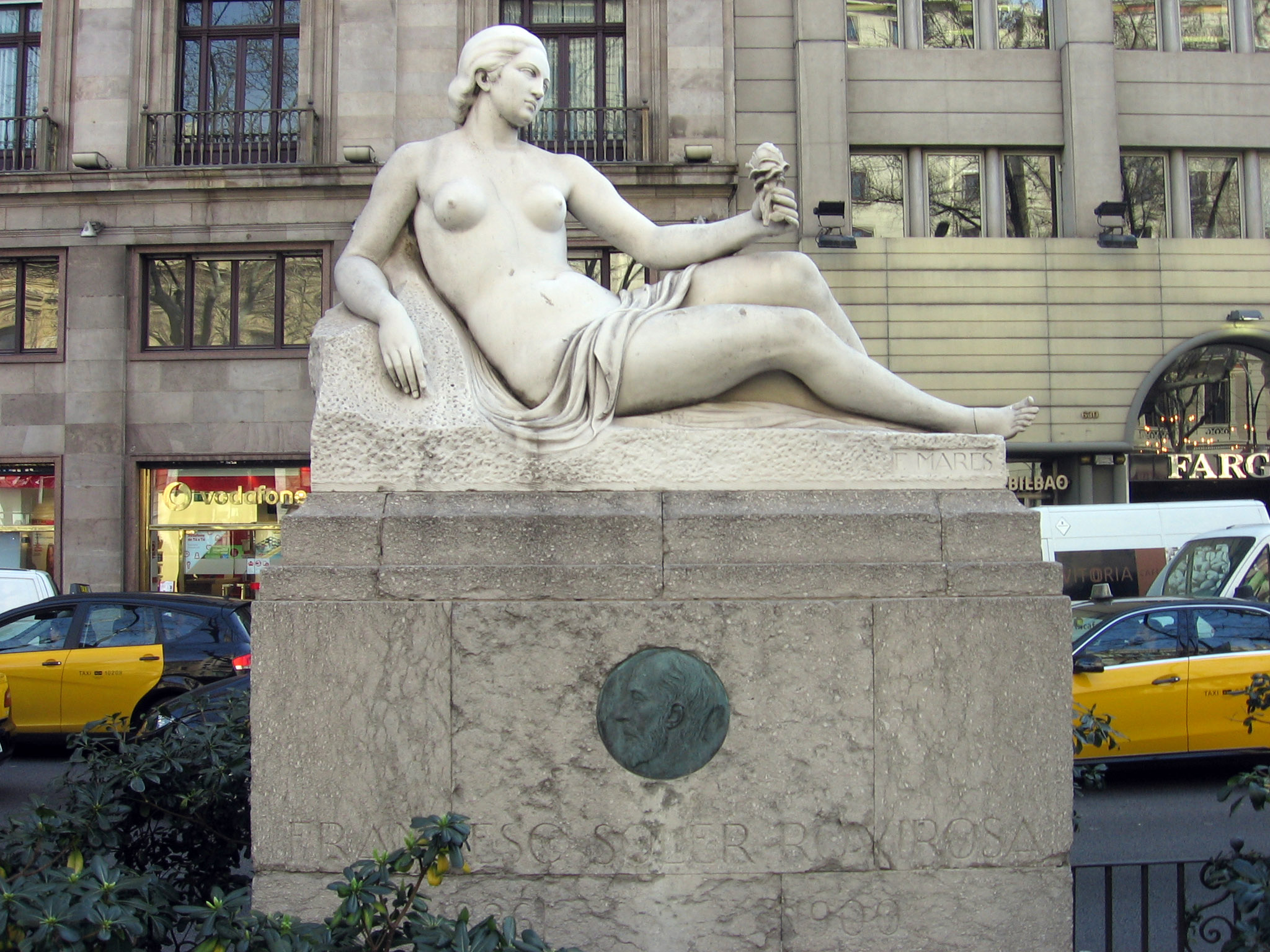
A Francesc Soler i Rovirosa (1930), by Frederic Marès, Gran Via de les Corts Catalanes.

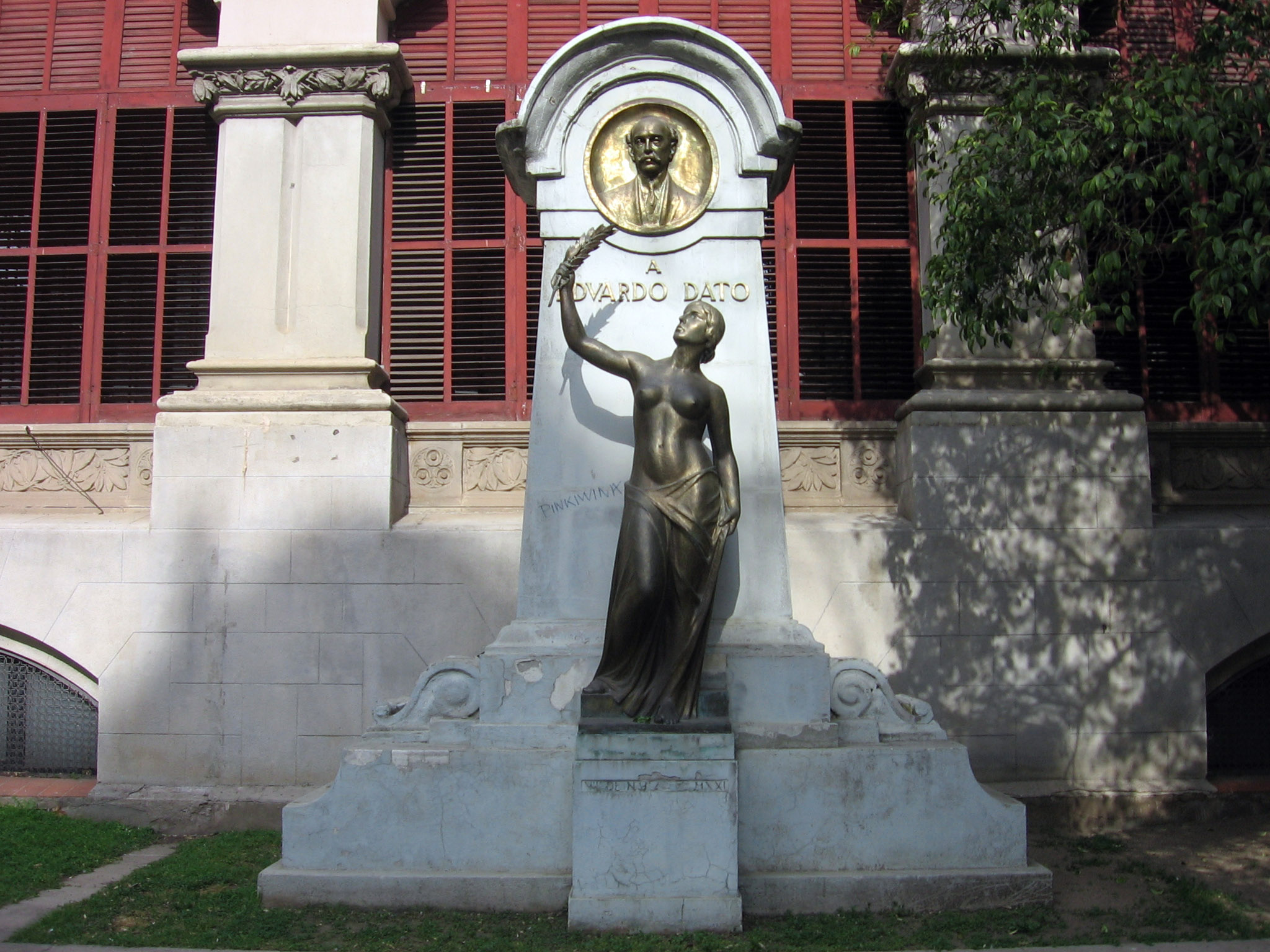
A Eduardo Dato (1930), by Jaume Duran, calle San Antonio María Claret.

=== 1992 Olympics ===
In 1992, the city undertook an intensive program of reforms and urban improvements for the XXV Olympic Games, mainly in Montjuïc, where the Olympic Stadium was remodelled. Further works were carried out on the Olympic villages Poblenou and Vall d'Hebron, as well as the construction of ring roads around the city, renovation to the city's beaches and seafront zone (Maremagnum), the installation of a new telecommunications tower and the renovation and expansion of the city's main airport.

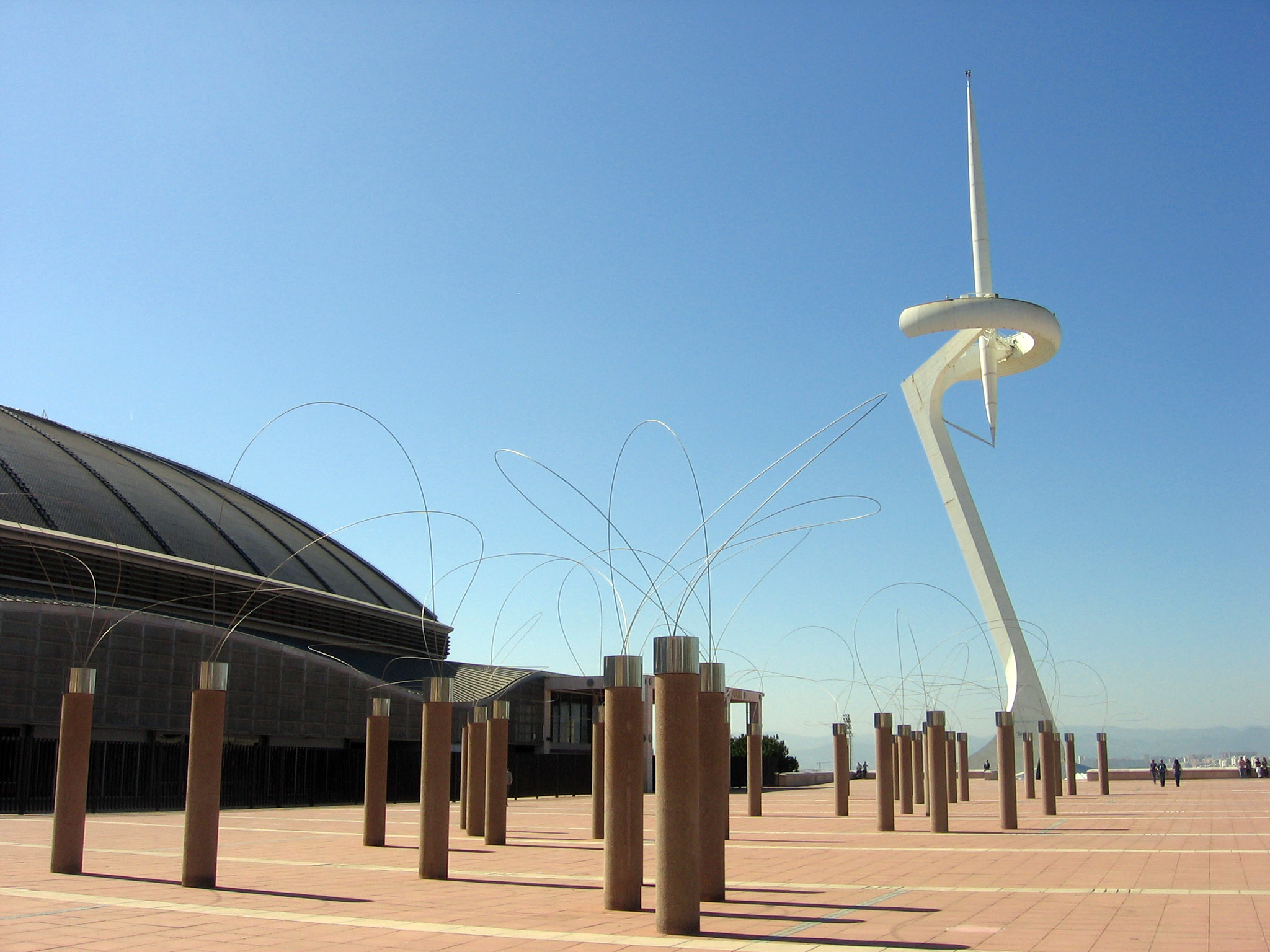
Change (Utsurohi) (1990) by Aiko Miyawaki, Passeig de Minici Natal.

Art installations near the Olympic Stadium included Change (Utsurohi) by Aiko Miyawaki, a collection of 36 stone columns and stainless steel cables forming a forest illuminated at dusk; and a bronze torso of an athlete at Olympic Rosa Serra. Also placed in front of the National Palace's headquarters, MNAC- sculpture Torso summer, Aristide Maillol, original work from 1911 donated by entrepreneurs Association to commemorate 1992 Barcelona Olympic Games with the restorative effect of the fact that the city had no work of this artist Roussillon, whatever had appreciated significantly influenced by the nineteenth-century style of the early twentieth century.

One of the main areas of activity was the Olympic Village of Poblenou. Where previous Games have taken place, several parks and monuments have been adored with works: Park Falls settled sculptures David and Goliath, by Antoni Llena, and the Power of the Word of Auke de Vries, both large and abstract style; Carlos Park and placed ass (a Santiago Roldan), Eduardo Úrculo, a play 6.5 meter high bronze shaped legs and buttocks; the Olympic Park is located in Port works Marc Robert Llimós, commemorating the opening of the Olympic Village and a pond sculpture of Cobi, the mascot of the Olympic Games, designed by Javier Mariscal; and Nova Icaria Park lies the Plaza of Champions with a pavement where are registered the names of several of the athletes and Olympic champions history, as well as a podium used the Games. There were also several individual works placed in different parts of the Olympic Village, such as fish, Frank Gehry; Aquarius-Pisces-Taurus Antoni Rosell Column Olympic Andreu Alfaro; The plan of nostalgia, Luis Ulloa; Cylinder, Tom Carr; Brush and Wind by Francesc Fornells-Pla.

There were also several sculptures placed in the Vall d'Hebron, site of the Olympic Village press: Form and Space, Eudald Serra, an abstract figure of six meters made of iron; Dime, dime, querido, Susana Solano, also abstract, consisting of four steel plates eight meters; and Mistos by Claes Oldenburg, 20 meters high, looks like a matchbox arranged in various positions, some on the ground as if it had already been used.

In other areas of the city were also major renovations, such as the Plaza de las Glories, one of the main roads of the city, where they placed twelve big marble slabs dedicated to several highlights of the history of Catalonia, in reference to the Glories that give name to the place; as well as a monument to the Metro, François Scali and Alain Domingo, a piece of steel that reproduces the topographic profile of the meridian connecting Barcelona to Dunkirk, which served to establish the extent -the metric system in 2014 was transferred to the Meridiana Avenue between Independence and Consell de Cent -.

In parallel with the Olympic Games a Cultural Olympiad was organised, promoting the installation of several works all situated on the coast, curated by Gloria Moure. These works include the following: Compass Rose, Lothar Baumgarten, in the Plaza Pau Vila; The wounded star, Rebecca Horn, the Promenade de la Barceloneta; Roman balance of Jannis Kounellis, Andrea Doria Street; Crescendo appare, Mario Merz, the Moll de la Barceloneta; A room where it always rains, Juan Muñoz, in the Plaza del Mar; Born Jaume Plensa, the Passeig del Born, Four wedges Ulrich Rückriem at Pla de Palau; and Deuce Coop, James Turrell, the street trade.

In connection with the Games, installation in different parts of the city in a series of commemorative Olympic sources, made by the sculptor Juan Bordes in collaboration with the architects Oscar Tusquets and Carlos Diaz. They were eight in total, all with an artificial stone pedestal and a bronze figure of a boy playing with water: Ball, Parallel Avenue; Launch the viewpoint of the National Palace; Diving, Avenue de Chile; Chip-splash in the Plaça Alfonso Comin; Pirouette, Isadora Duncan Street; Ream, Coastal Avenue; Deepening to- at the Poblenou breakwater; and Rough estimate, in the Plaza de las Glories.

== Gallery ==
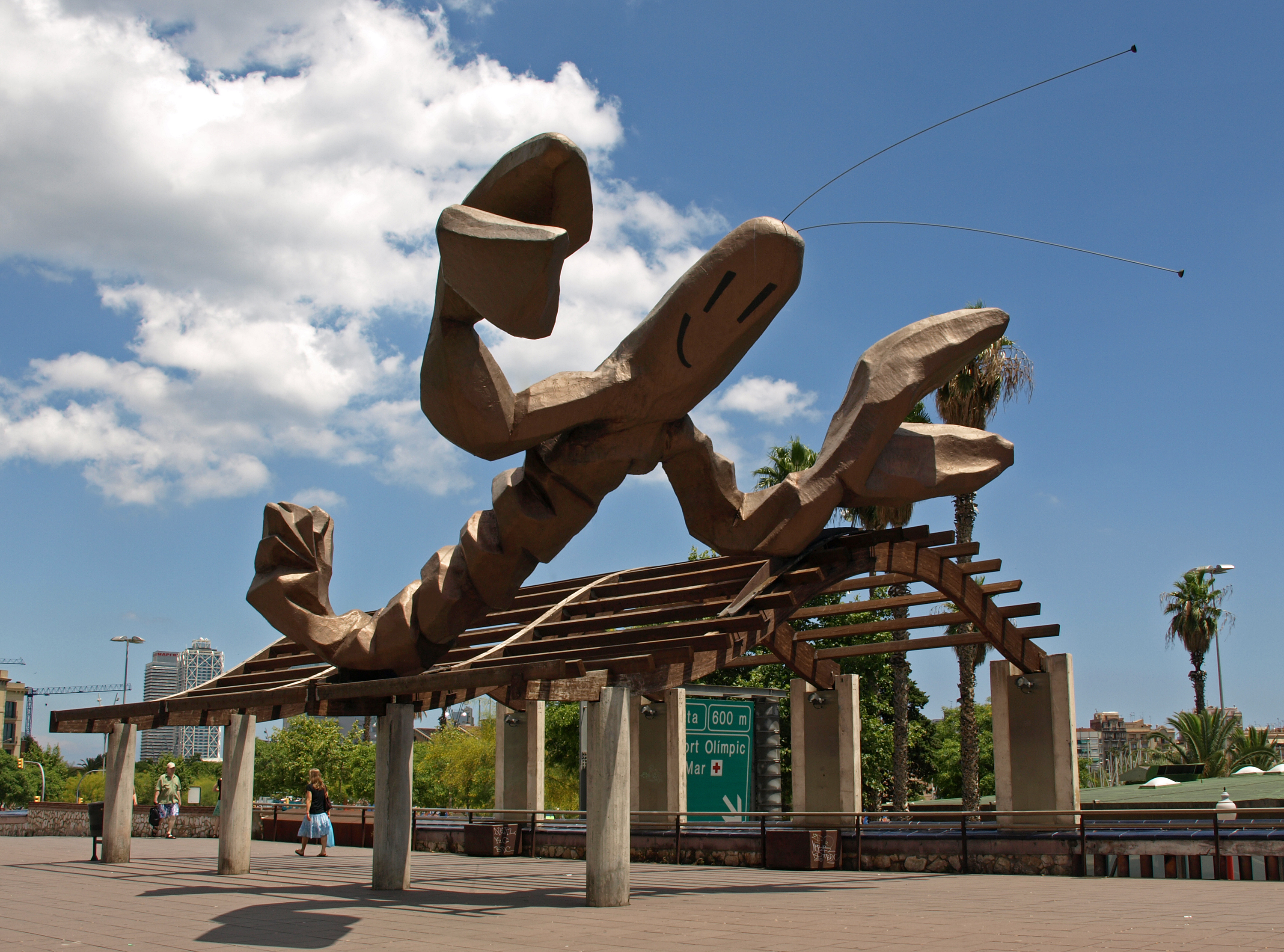
La Gamba (1989), by Javier Mariscal, Passeig de Colom

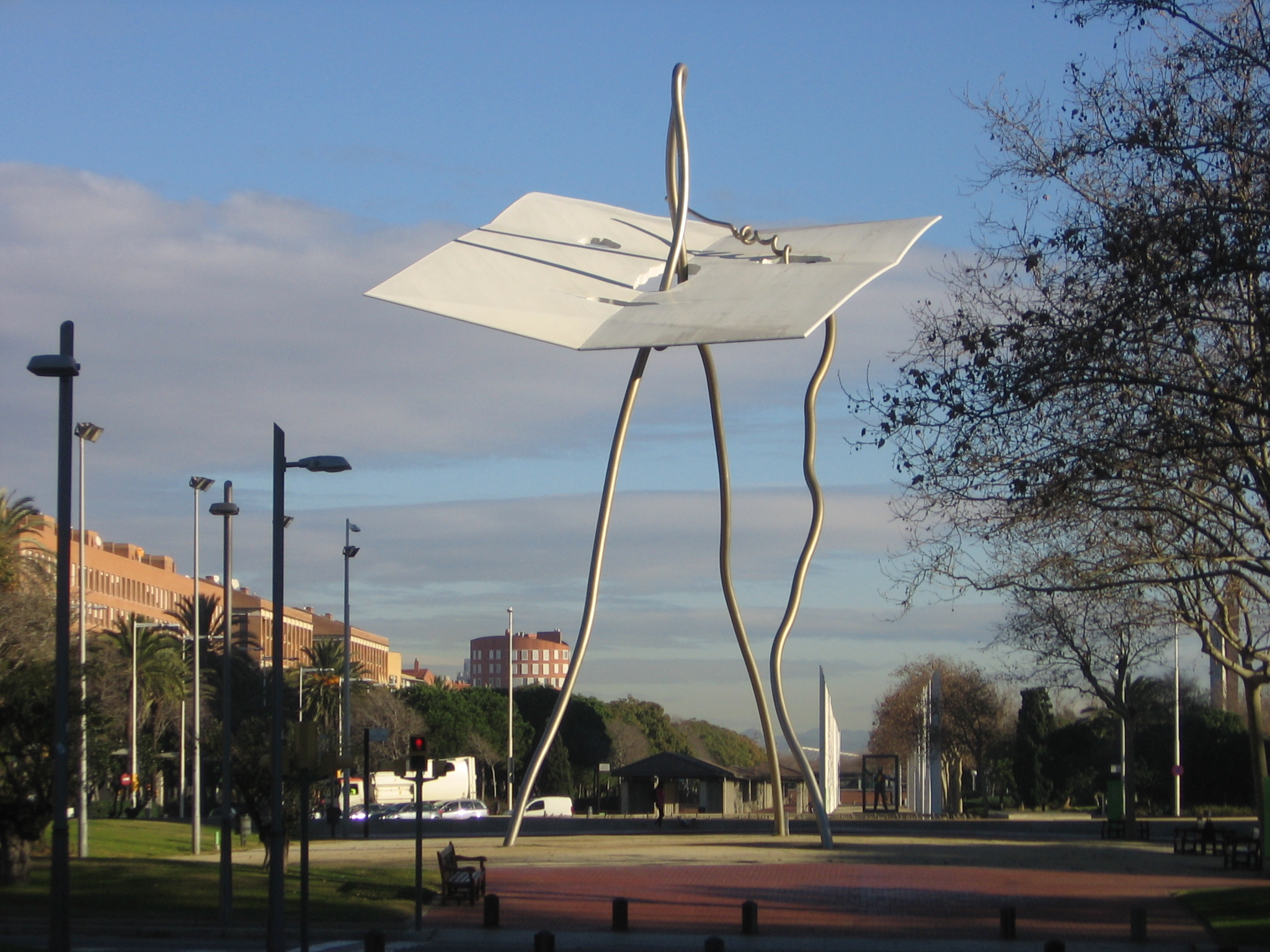
David i Goliat (1992), by Antoni Llena, Parc de les Cascades

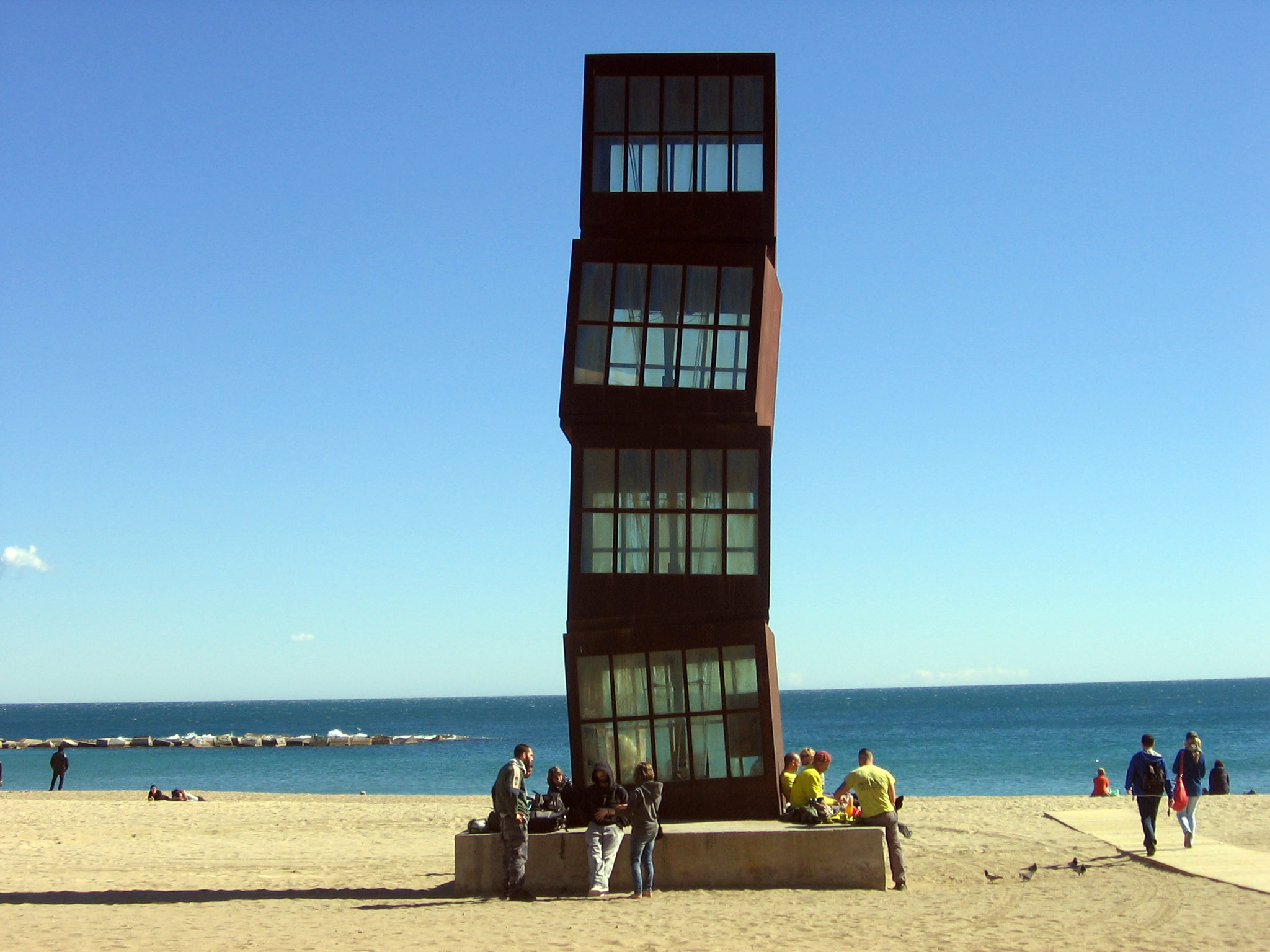
L'estel ferit (1992), by Rebecca Horn, Passeig Marítim de la Barceloneta

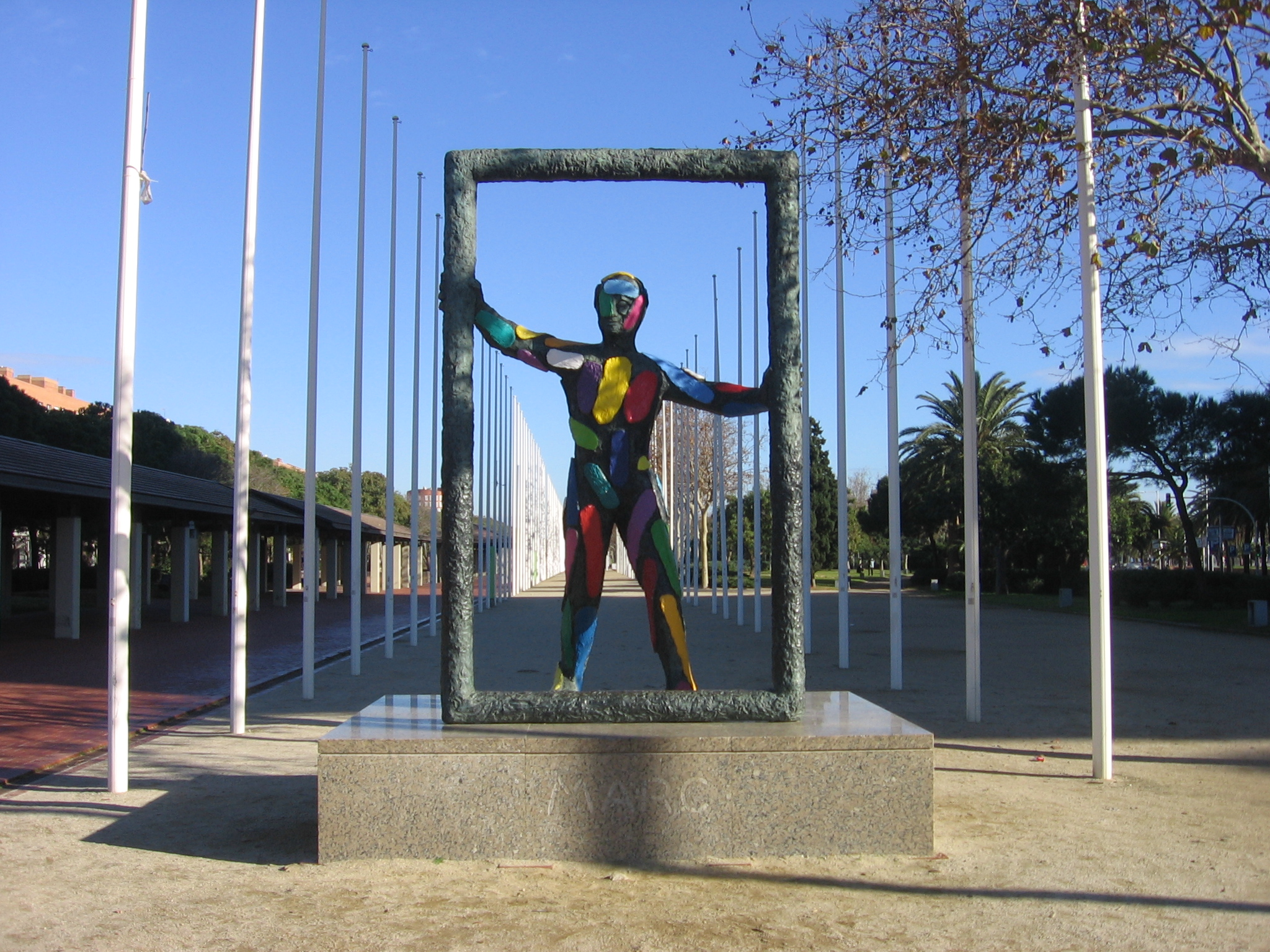
Marc (1997), by Robert Llimós, Parc del Port Olímpic

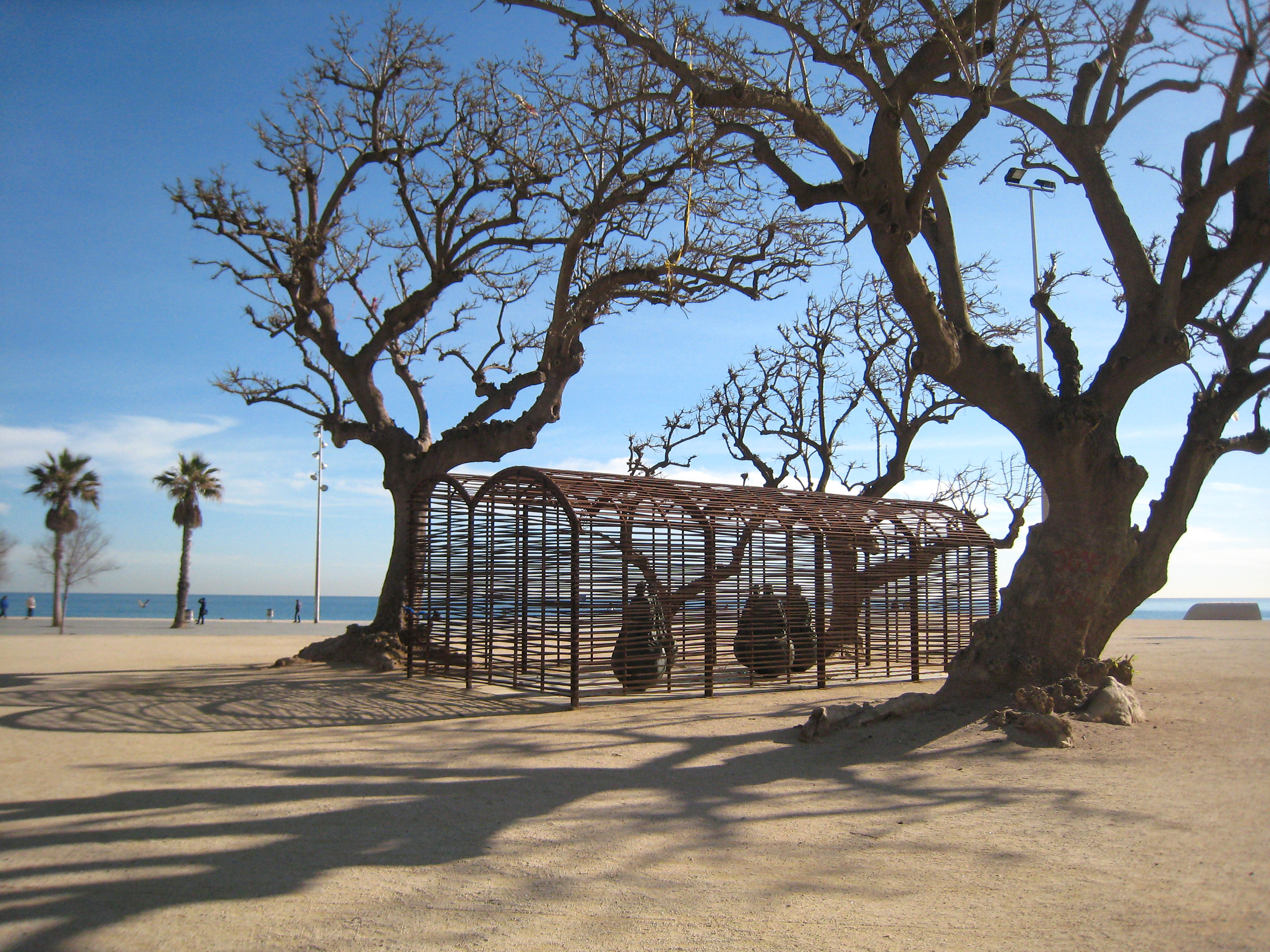
Una habitació on sempre plou (1992), by Juan Muñoz, Plaça del Mar

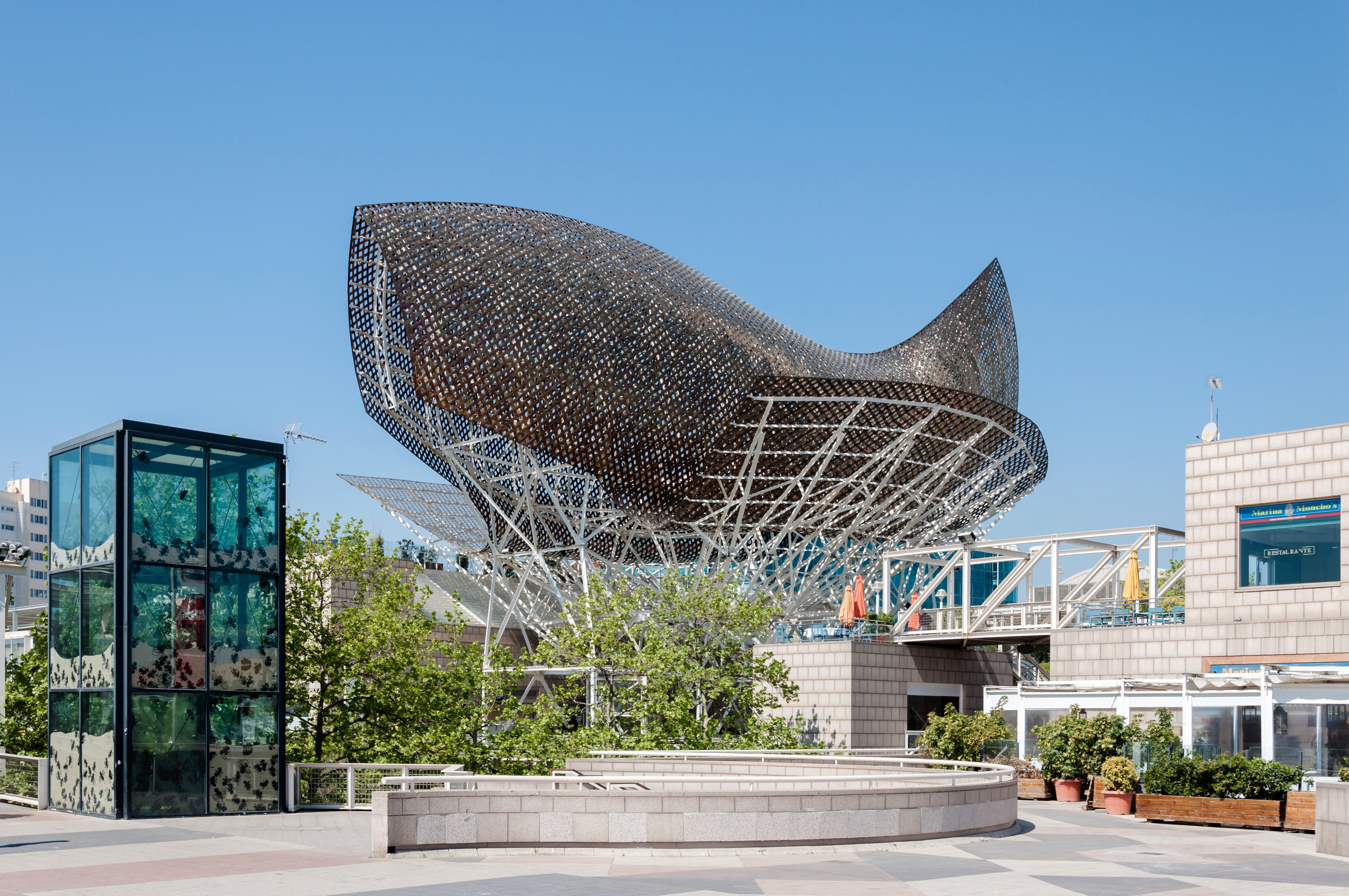
El Peix (1992), by Frank Gehry, Passeig Marítim de la Barceloneta

== See also ==
- Museu Frederic Marès
- Parks and gardens of Barcelona
- Street furniture in Barcelona
- Street names in Barcelona
- Urban planning of Barcelona
- Josep Massanès i Mestres
