= Jaume =

Jaume (Catalan: [ˈʒawmə]) is a Catalan male given name. It is the equivalent of James.

== Notable people ==
Notable people with this given name include:

- Jaume Agelet i Garriga (1888–1981), Catalan poet
- Jaume Aiguader (1882–1943), Spanish medical doctor, writer, social activist, and politician
- Jaume Alonso-Cuevillas (born 1961), Spanish academic, lawyer, and politician
- Jaume Amat (born 1970), Spanish former field hockey player
- Jaume Aragall (born 1939), Spanish tenor
- Jaume Asens (born 1972), Spanish politician
- Jaume Balagueró (born 1968), Spanish filmmaker
- Jaume Barberà (born 1955), Spanish journalist and TV host
- Jaume Bartumeu (born 1954), Andorran lawyer and politician
- Jaume Bassó (1929–2021), Spanish basketball player
- Jaume Bauzà (born 1959), Spanish retired footballer
- Jaume Blassi (born 1948), Spanish photographer
- Jaume Bonet (born 1957), Spanish football coach
- Jaume Bosch, several people
- Jaume Busquets (1903–1968), Spanish sculptor and painter
- Jaume Cabré (born 1947), Catalan writer
- Jaume Calucho (born 1927), Spanish cyclist
- Jaume Camprodon i Rovira (1926–2016), Catholic bishop
- Jaume Camps i Rovira (1944–2022), Spanish lawyer and politician
- Jaume Capdevila (born 1974), Spanish cartoonist and caricaturist
- Jaume Cardona (1405–1466), Catholic cardinal
- Jaume Casals (born 1958), Catalan professor of philosophy
- Jaume Cascalls (early 14th century–1378), Catalan sculptor
- Jaume Castells Ferrer (born 1942), Spanish politician
- Jaume Clotet (born 1974), Catalan journalist, historian, and writer
- Jaume Collboni (born 1969), Spanish politician, lawyer by profession, and civil servant
- Jaume Comas (born 1974), Spanish retired professional basketball player
- Jaume Costa (born 1988), Spanish professional footballer
- Jaume Cuadrat (1899–1993), Catalan writer
- Jaume Cuéllar (born 2001), Spanish professional footballer
- Jaume d'Agramunt, Catalan medical doctor and writer
- Jaume Delgado (born 1983), Spanish retired footballer
- Jaume Doménech (born 1990), Spanish professional footballer
- Jaume Duch (born 1962), Spanish politician
- Jaume Durán (born 1984), Spanish footballer
- Jaume Elías (1919–1977), Spanish footballer
- Jaume Fàbrega (born 1948), Spanish gastronomy writer, journalist, historian, and professor
- Jaume Ferran i Clua (1851–1929), Spanish-French bacteriologist and sanitarian
- Jaume Ferrer (14th century), Majorcan sailor and explorer
- Jaume Fort (born 1966), Spanish handball player
- Jaume Giró (born 1964), Catalan corporate executive
- Jaume Grau (born 1997), Spanish professional footballer
- Jaume Guardeño (born 20 February 2003) is a Spanish cyclist
- Jaume Guardiola Romojaro (born 1957), Catalan businessperson and former CEO of Banc Sabadell
- Jaume Huguet (1412–1492), Catalan painter
- Jaume Jardí (born 2002), Spanish professional footballer
- Jaume Llambi (born 1974), Spanish wheelchair basketball player
- Jaume March, several people
- Jaume Martinez Vich (born 1993), Spanish professional pickleball player
- Jaume Mas, 17th century Bishop of Vic in Tarragona
- Jaume Masià (born 2000), Spanish Grand Prix motorcycle rider
- Jaume Matas (born 1956), Spanish politician
- Jaume Mateu (1382–1452), Valencian painter
- Jaume Mateu (actor) (born 1985), Mexican actor
- Jaume Medina (1949–2023), Catalan philologist, Latinist, writer, translator, and poet
- Jaume Miravitlles (1906–1988), Catalan writer, politician, and journalist
- Jaume Mora, Spanish physician and researcher
- Jaume Morales Moltó (born 1973), Valencian pilota professional player
- Jaume Morera i Galícia (1854–1927), Catalan landscape painter
- Jaume Munar (born 1997), Spanish tennis player
- Jaume Mut (born 1964), Spanish retired footballer
- Jaume Muxart (1922–2019), Spanish painter
- Jaume Nomen (born 1960), Spanish oral and maxillofacial surgeon, and amateur astronomer
- Jaume Ortí (1947–2017), Spanish businessman
- Jaume Padrós i Selma (born 1959), Catalan physician and politician
- Jaume Pahissa (1880–1969), Spanish-born composer and musicologist
- Jaume Perich (1941–1995), Catalan illustrator and humorist
- Jaume Plensa (born 1955), Spanish artist
- Jaume Raventos (19050–1982), Catalan scientist and pharmacologist
- Jaume Roig (early 15th century-1478), Valencian doctor and writer
- Jaume Roures (born 1950), Spanish businessman and film producer
- Jaume Rovira, several people
- Jaume Safont (1420–1487), Catalan poet and notary
- Jaume Sastre (born 1959), Spanish literature and Catalan language teacher
- Jaume Sanllorente (born 1976), Spanish writer, journalist, and activist for Human Rights
- Jaume Serra, several people
- Jaume Sisa (born 1948), Spanish singer and songwriter
- Jaume Sobregrau (born 1986), Spanish footballer
- Jaume Subirana i Ortín (born 1963), Catalan writer, scholar, and blogger
- Jaume Sureda (born 1996), Spanish former professional cyclist
- Jaume Traserra Cunillera (1934–2019), Spanish Roman Catholic bishop
- Jaume Vallcorba Plana (1949–2014), Spanish philologist and publisher
- Jaume Vicens i Vives (1910–1960), Catalan historian
- Jaume Vives (born 1992), Spanish journalist, activist, and writer

== As surname ==
Notable people with the surname Jaume include:

- Pere Jaume Borrell, known as "Perejaume" (born 1957), Catalan contemporary artist
- Bernat Jaume (born 1995), Spanish squash player
- Carla Jaume Soler (born 2004), Spanish female freestyle wrestler
- Carolina Jaume (born 1985), Ecuadorian actress
- Diego Jaume (born 1973), Uruguayan football manager
- Gabriel Escarrer Jaume (born 1971), Spanish businessman
- Gabriel Llompart y Jaume Santandreu, Spanish ecclesiastic
- Germinal Esgleas Jaume (1903–1981), Catalan anarcho-syndicalist
- Miguel Jaume y Bosch (1844–1900), Spanish painter
- Quima Jaume i Carbo (1934–1993), Catalan Spanish poet
- Víctor Latou Jaume (1913–2002), Uruguayan basketball player
