= Sculptures in Plaça de Catalunya =

Set of sculptures in Barcelona

Sculptures in Catalonia square
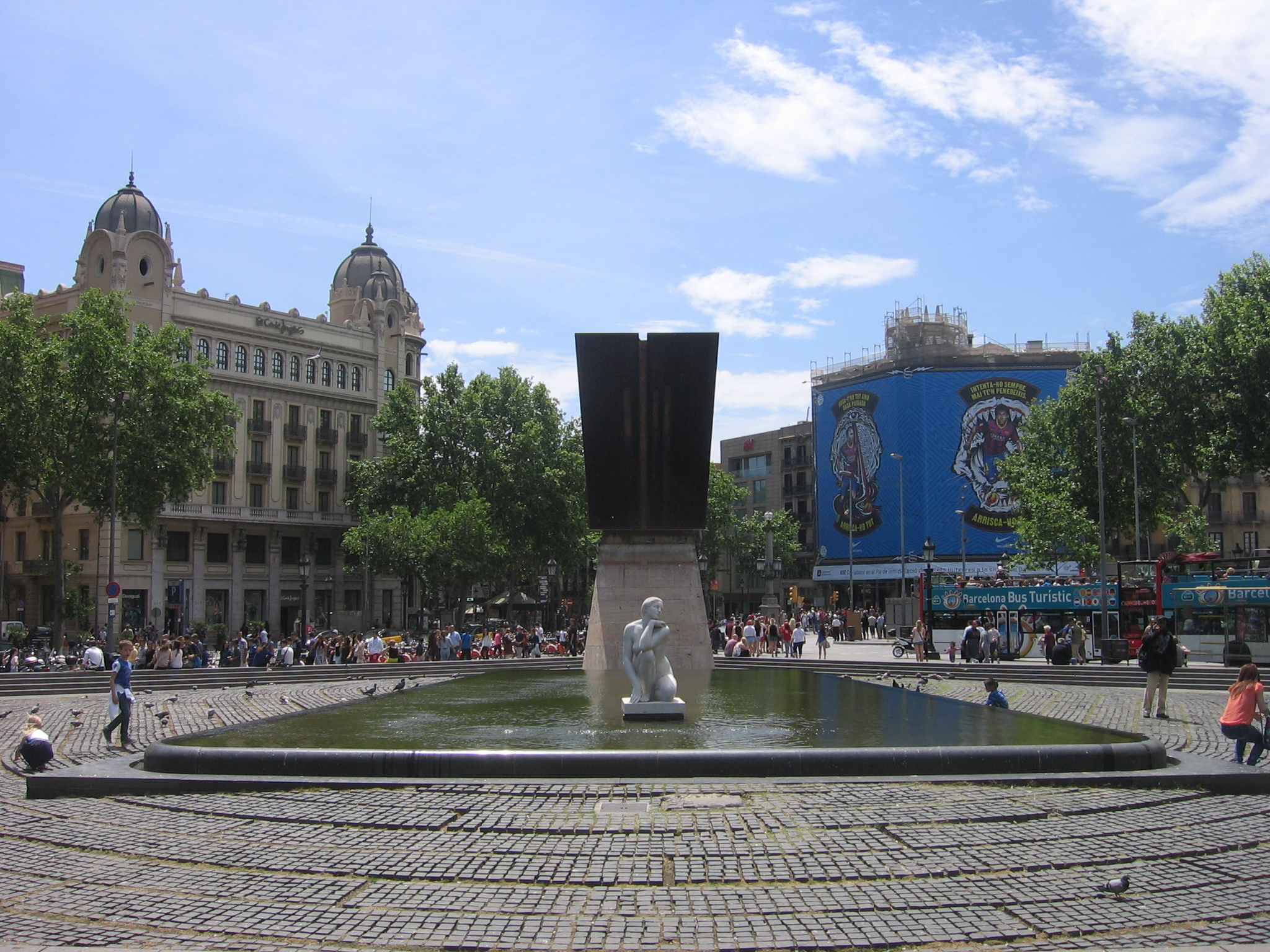
- Artist: Francesc Nebot (architecture); Eusebi Arnau, Joan Borrell, Enric Casanovas, Josep Clarà, Josep Dunyach, Jaume Duran, Pablo Gargallo, Josep Llimona, Frederic Marès, Enric Monjo, Vicente Navarro, Llucià Oslé, Miquel Oslé, Jaume Otero, Antonio Parera, Josep Maria Subirachs, Josep Tenas and Josep Viladomat (sculpture)
- Year: 1927 - 1929
- Location: Barcelona, Spain; 41°23′12″N 2°10′12″E

The set of sculptures in the Plaça de Catalunya was created between 1927 and 1929 for the 1929 Barcelona International Exposition. The Catalonia Square (in Catalan: Plaça de Catalunya) is one of the main centers of Barcelona, and is located in the Eixample district, at the confluence between the Rambla de Canaletas, the carrer de Pelai, the ronda de la Universitat, the Rambla de Catalunya, Passeig de Gràcia, Ronda de Sant Pere, Fontanella street and Portal de l'Àngel. It has an area of 5 hectares.

Plaça de Catalunya began to be urbanized in 1902, although the high point of the works took place in the 1920s, with a view to the celebration of the International Exposition. In 1927 a public competition was organized to decorate the square, in which it was decided to install 28 sculptures by artists such as Eusebi Arnau, Joan Borrell, Enric Casanovas, Josep Clarà, Josep Dunyach, Jaume Duran, Pablo Gargallo, Josep Llimona, Frederic Marès, Enric Monjo, Vicenç Navarro, Llucià Oslé, Miquel Oslé, Jaume Otero, Antonio Parera, Josep Tenas and Josep Viladomat. This ensemble is one of the largest in Barcelona in terms of public art, and is an authentic open-air sculpture museum.

== History ==
Barcelona had fond memories of the Universal Exposition of 1888, which represented a great advance for the city in the economic and technological fields, as well as the remodeling of the Ciutadella Park. Therefore, in the 1920s, a new exhibition was planned to showcase the new technological advances and promote the image of Catalan industry abroad. Once again, the exhibition led to the remodeling of a part of the city, in this case the Montjuic mountain, as well as its surrounding areas, especially the Plaça d'Espanya. But numerous actions were also carried out throughout the city, such as the remodeling of Plaça de Catalunya; the landscaping of Plazas Tetuán, Urquinaona and Letamendi; the construction of the Marina Bridge; and the extension of Avinguda Diagonal to the west and Gran Via de les Corts Catalanes to the southwest. Various public works were also carried out: street asphalting and sewerage were improved, public toilets were installed and gas lighting was replaced by electric lighting. Several buildings were remodeled, such as the City Hall and the Generalitat, the Post Office building and the Estación de Francia, which had been under construction for several years, were completed, and the Royal Palace of Pedralbes was built as the residence of the royal family. Finally, the city's communications were improved, with the construction of the El Prat Airport, the improvement of links to the suburbs, the electrification of public streetcars and the extension of Metro line 1. All these public works led to a strong demand for employment, causing a large increase in immigration to the city from all parts of Spain.

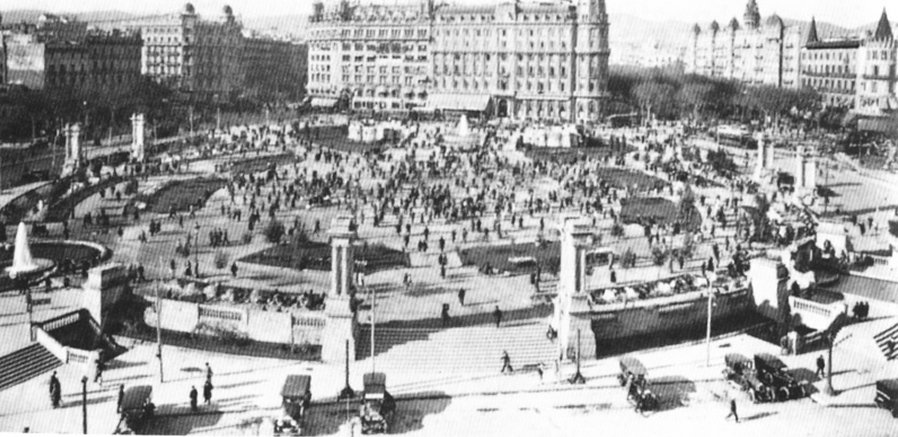
Plaça de Catalunya in 1927.

The Exposition meant a great urban development for Barcelona, as well as a testing ground for the new architectural styles developed at the beginning of the 20th century. Locally, it represented the consolidation of Noucentisme, a classicist style that replaced the modernism that prevailed in Catalonia during the turn of the century. It also meant the introduction in Spain of international avant-garde trends, especially architectural rationalism, through the German Pavilion of Ludwig Mies van der Rohe.

As for the Plaza de Cataluña, it was extensively remodeled. It was formerly an esplanade on the outskirts of the medieval center, which did not begin to be developed until 1902. This square was not foreseen in Ildefonso Cerdá's Eixample plan, and was added to the project by the Barcelona City Council as a link between the old city and the new neighborhoods that emerged after the demolition of the medieval walls. Since 1860, several buildings were built, such as houses and entertainment venues of various kinds, such as circuses and theaters. For the Universal Exposition of 1888 some gardening work was done and a pond with a fountain was installed in the center of the square. Between the end of the 19th century and the beginning of the 20th century, the land necessary for the square was expropriated, and in 1902 the first effective intervention was made, in the form of paths and flowerbeds, with a layout in the shape of a cross.

Since then, several urbanization projects were considered but did not come to a successful conclusion, the last one designed by Josep Puig i Cadafalch in 1915. Finally, in 1923, a competition was organized among professors of the School of Architecture, and on February 17, 1925, the project drawn up by Francesc Nebot, director of the School and deputy mayor of Public Works, was chosen, leading a team formed by Pere Domènech i Roura, Enric Catà, Eugenio Cendoya, Félix de Azúa and Antoni Darder. The works took place between 1926 and 1929, although during their progress the square was inaugurated by Alfonso XIII on November 2, 1927.

In the middle of the process, in January 1927, Nebot resigned as director of the works, because the council rejected his intention to place in the upper part of the square a pavilion with a colonnade decorated with female sculptures. He was replaced by Joaquim Llansó, assisted by Josep Cabestany and Nicolás María Rubió Tudurí.

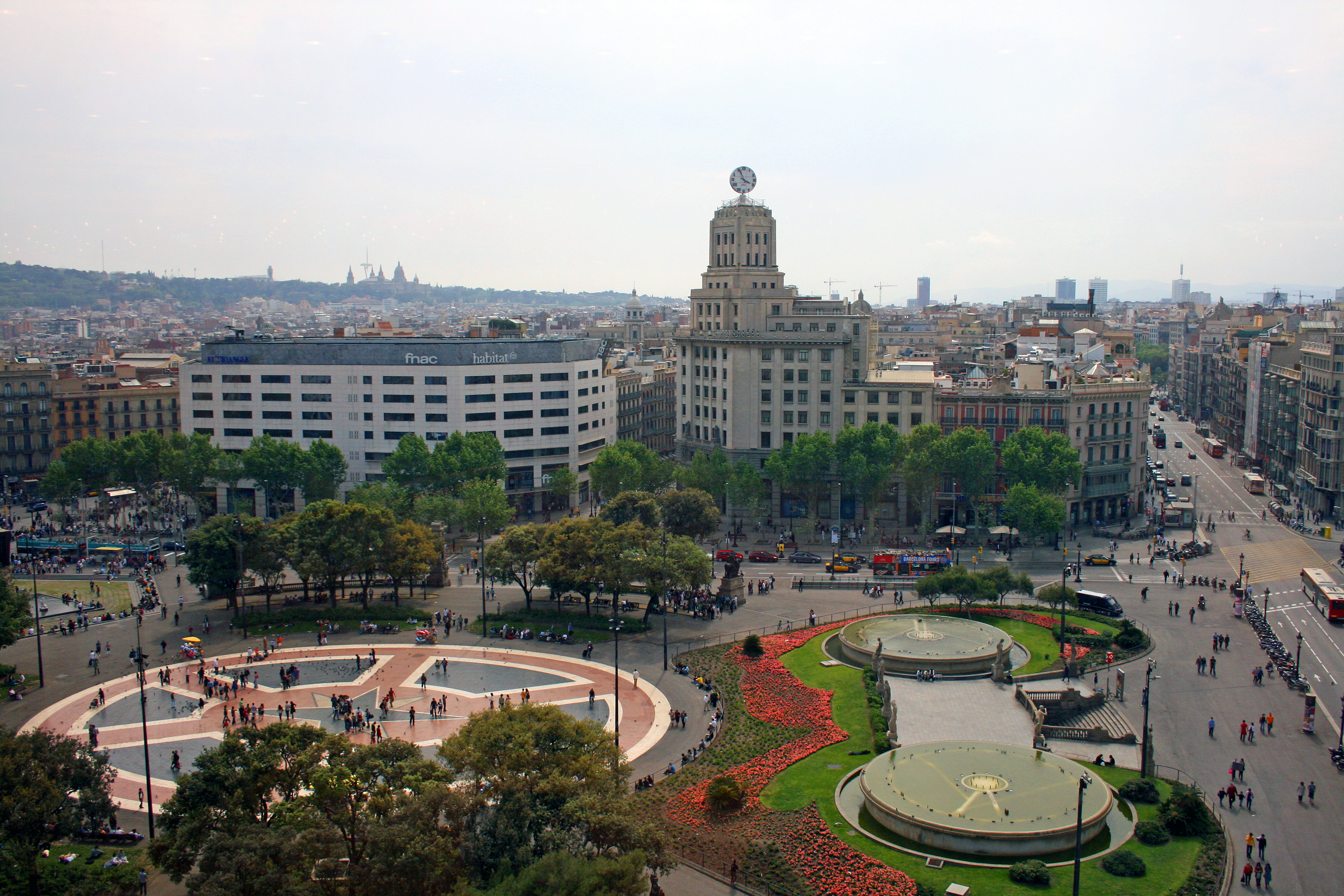
Aerial view of the Square.

A public competition was organized in 1927 to decorate the square, with a jury made up of politicians and municipal technicians and a representation of the main artistic entities of the city. Ninety projects were presented, of which the allegorical groups of Wisdom and Work by the Oslé brothers were chosen to appear in front of the Ramblas; three allegories of the Catalan provinces (Barcelona, by Marès; Gerona, by Parera; and Lérida, by Borrell) —the one of Tarragona was commissioned out of competition to Jaume Otero—; 16 stone statues for the colonnaded pavilion designed by Nebot, with works by Viladomat, Tarrach, Clarà, Llimona, Casanovas, Dunyach, Navarro, Arnau and Gargallo; and 12 statues and high reliefs for the niches in the square, by the artists Llimona, Navarro, Arnau, Tenas, Duran, Monjo, Gargallo, Alsina, Tarrach, Renart, Rebull and Soto. However, because of the "notorious difference in style with the rest of the square" the works of the last five were finally rejected in March 1928, and replaced by others by Monjo, Marès, Otero, Parera and Borrell. On the other hand, the derogation of the construction of the upper pavilion meant that in May 1929 eight of the sixteen sculptures planned for that space were finally not placed, while the rest were placed on a terrace that replaced the pavilion. Lastly, the placement of La Diosa by Clarà, a commission outside the competition, was approved.

Finally, 28 works were installed: Maternity, by Vicenç Navarro; Young, by Josep Dunyach; The forger, by Josep Llimona; Woman with child and piccolo, by Josep Viladomat; Female Figure, by Enric Casanovas; Youth, by Josep Clarà; Flute Shepherd, by Pablo Gargallo; Navigation, by Eusebi Arnau; Barcelona, by Frederic Marès; Montserrat, by Eusebi Arnau; Female Figure, by Josep Llimona; Hercules, by Antonio Parera; Woman with Angel, by Vicenç Navarro; Tarragona, by Jaume Otero; Fuente de los seis putti, by Jaume Otero; Lérida, by Joan Borrell; Mujer con imagen de la Virgen, by Enric Monjo; El espíritu popular, by Jaume Otero; Pastor del águila, by Pablo Gargallo; Pomona, by Enric Monjo; Wisdom, by Miquel Oslé; The Goddess, by Josep Clarà; Work, by Llucià Oslé; Emporion, by Frederic Marès; Fisherman, by Josep Tenas; Woman, by Joan Borrell; Montseny, by Jaume Duran; and Gerona, by Antonio Parera. Originally there was also in the square the group Niños cabalgando sobre peces (1928), by Frederic Marès, a fountain with water jets and four of the figures indicated in the title, which was moved in 1961 to the intersection of Gran Vía and Rambla de Cataluña.

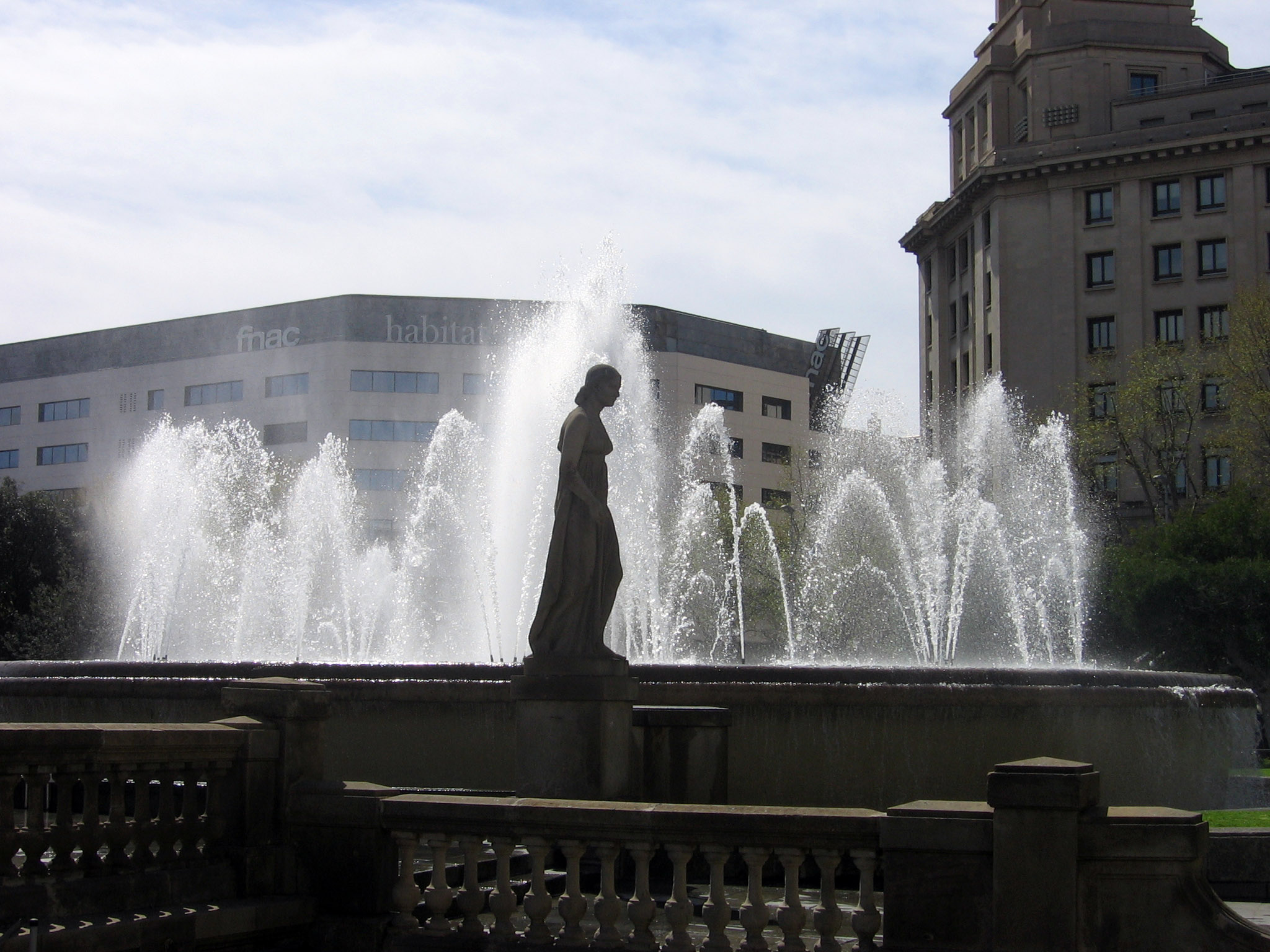
Ornamental fountain.

With regard to this set, some changes made on the way in the original project led to the replacement of several pieces and their transfer to other areas of the city. One of the main reasons was the cancellation of the pavilion designed by Nebot, so some of the sculptures made for this element were relocated in different places: four of them, executed by Eusebi Arnau, Josep Llimona, Enric Casanovas and Àngel Tarrach, were placed on the entrance wall of the Royal Palace of Pedralbes; two others, by Josep Dunyach (Diosa) and Vicenç Navarro (La noche), were installed in the park of the Citadel; and two more (Fertilidad, by Josep Clarà, and La vendimiadora, by Pablo Gargallo), in the Miramar Gardens, in Montjuic. Another reason for the surplus of works was the decision to make all the sculptural groups in the square in bronze —except for those on the upper terrace, which are in stone—, with the result that some works that had already been executed in stone had to be repeated, and the surplus were relocated: Lérida, by Manuel Fuxá, and Tarragona, by Jaume Otero, which were installed on Avinguda Diagonal, in front of the Royal Palace of Pedralbes. Finally, the work entitled Marinada or Danzarina, by Antonio Alsina, was placed in the gardens of the Umbráculo, in the Santa Madrona de Montjuic promenade, in this case because it was a female nude that was not seen with good eyes by the prevailing morals of the time.

Between November and December 1928 various religious and parents' associations launched a moralizing campaign against the excess of nudes in the square, which was answered between December 1928 and January 1929 by various artistic associations, and even a group of Catholic ladies who thought it "ridiculous to consider the nude in art as an obscene work". Even so, the moralizing campaign caused the withdrawal of Clarà's La diosa for a few months, although it was later returned to its location. Its main achievement was the exile of Antonio Alsina's Marinada to a secluded place in the mountain of Montjuic —this sculptor was left without a work in the square, since another of the initially approved works, Los bueyes de la abundancia, was discarded for stylistic reasons, and after a time stored in a warehouse, it is now in the park of Industrial Spain—. On the other hand, some of the works were mutilated, such as the first version of the Tarragona de Otero group —currently on Avinguda Diagonal—, which presented an integral female nude that had to be covered with a drape on the pubis, while a naked angel on a dolphin was eliminated.

Since 1929 the sculptural ensemble of the square has remained practically unchanged, with the exception of the transfer in 1961 of the Fountain of the children riding fish, or the replacement in 1982 of the Goddess by Clarà by a copy, since the original was placed in the lobby of the Casa de la Ciudad. In 1937 a Monument to the Unknown Soldier was placed, work of Miquel Paredes, which was removed two years later after the victory of Franco's army. In 1959 the ornamental fountains were installed on the mountain side of the square, the work of Fernando Espiau Seoane. The last sculpture was placed in 1991, the Monument to Francesc Macià by Josep Maria Subirachs. In 1993 were replaced by copies of the Youth by Clarà and the Pastor of the flute of Gargallo, due to its state of deterioration. In 2008 works were carried out by the company RUBATEC to remodel the pavement surrounding the square, the mosaic that houses in the center and improve access by adding ramps.

Sculptures discarded from the Square

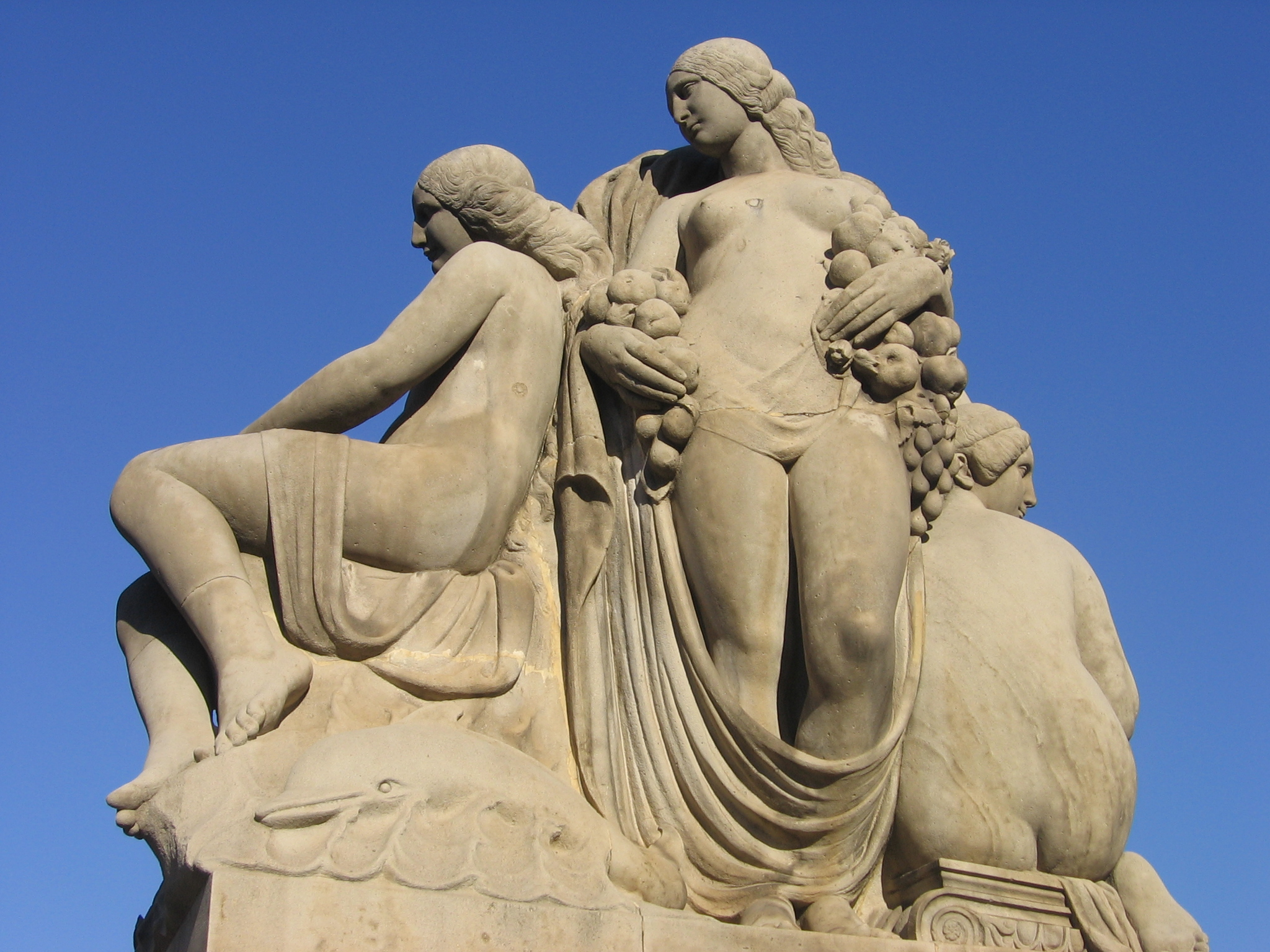
Tarragona, by Jaume Otero, avinguda Diagonal.

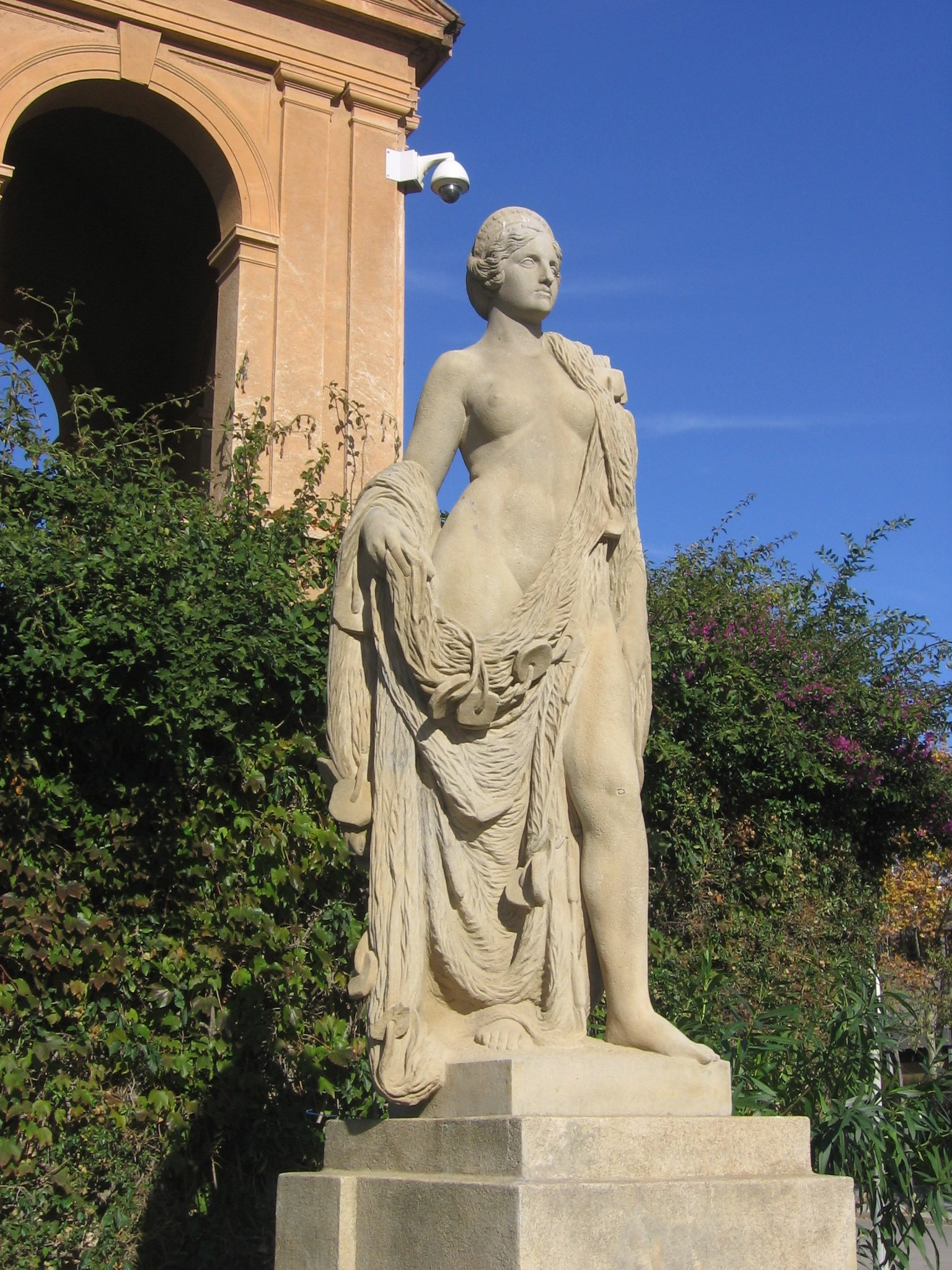
Marina, de Eusebi Arnau, Royal Palace of Pedralbes.

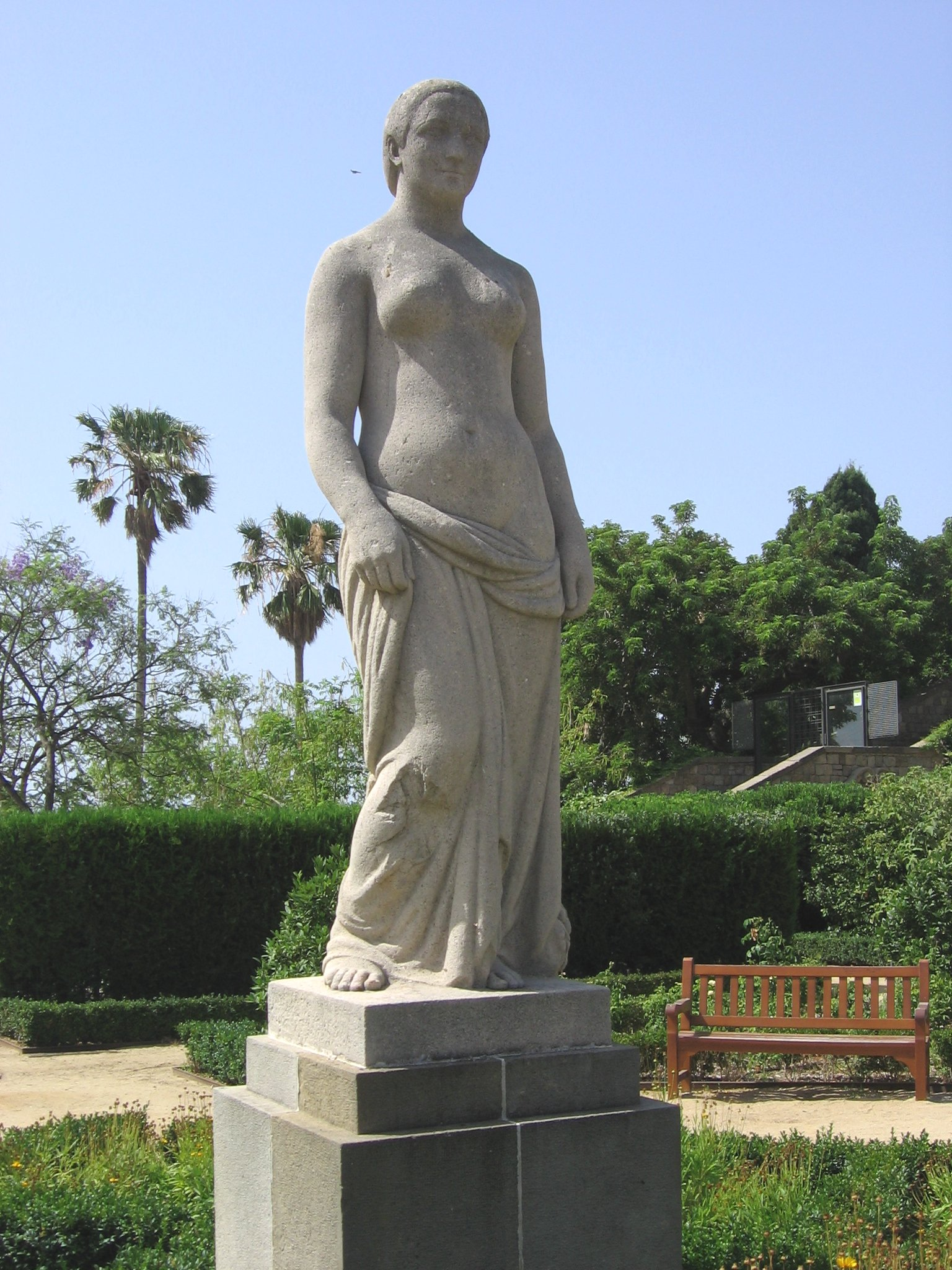
Fertility, de Josep Clarà, jardins de Miramar.

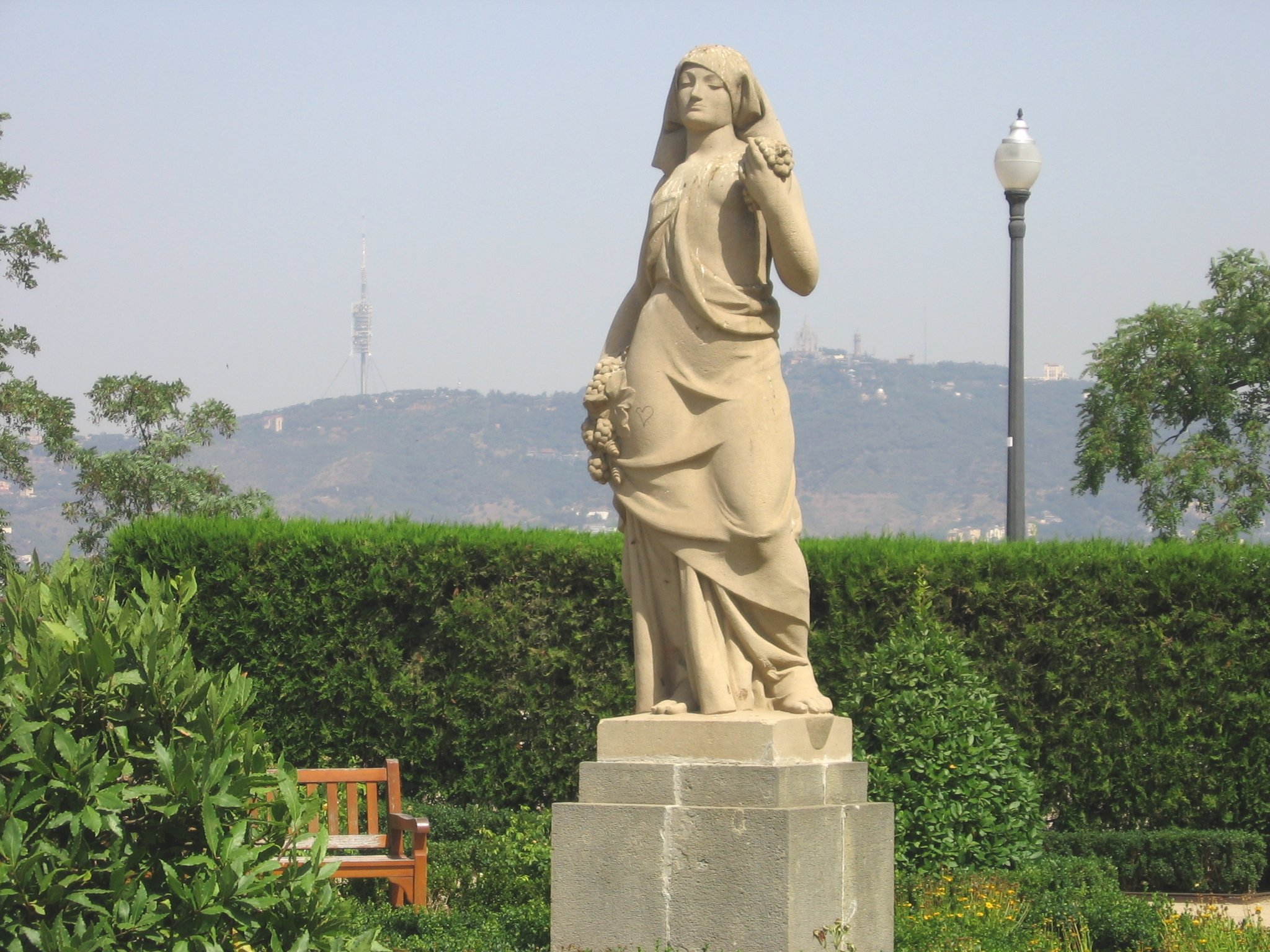
La vendimiadora, by Pablo Gargallo, jardins de Miramar.

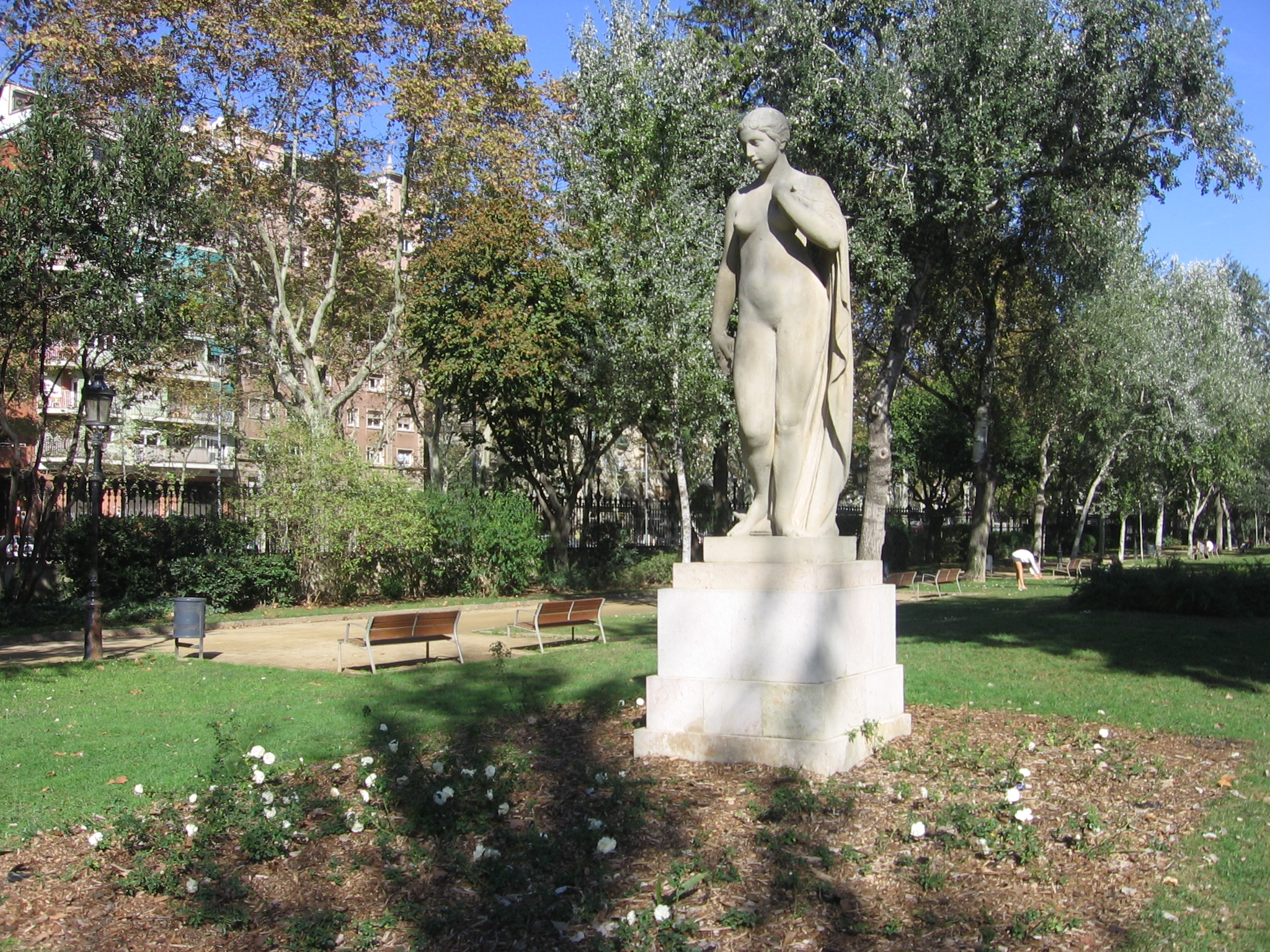
Goddess, de Josep Dunyach, parc de la Ciutadella.

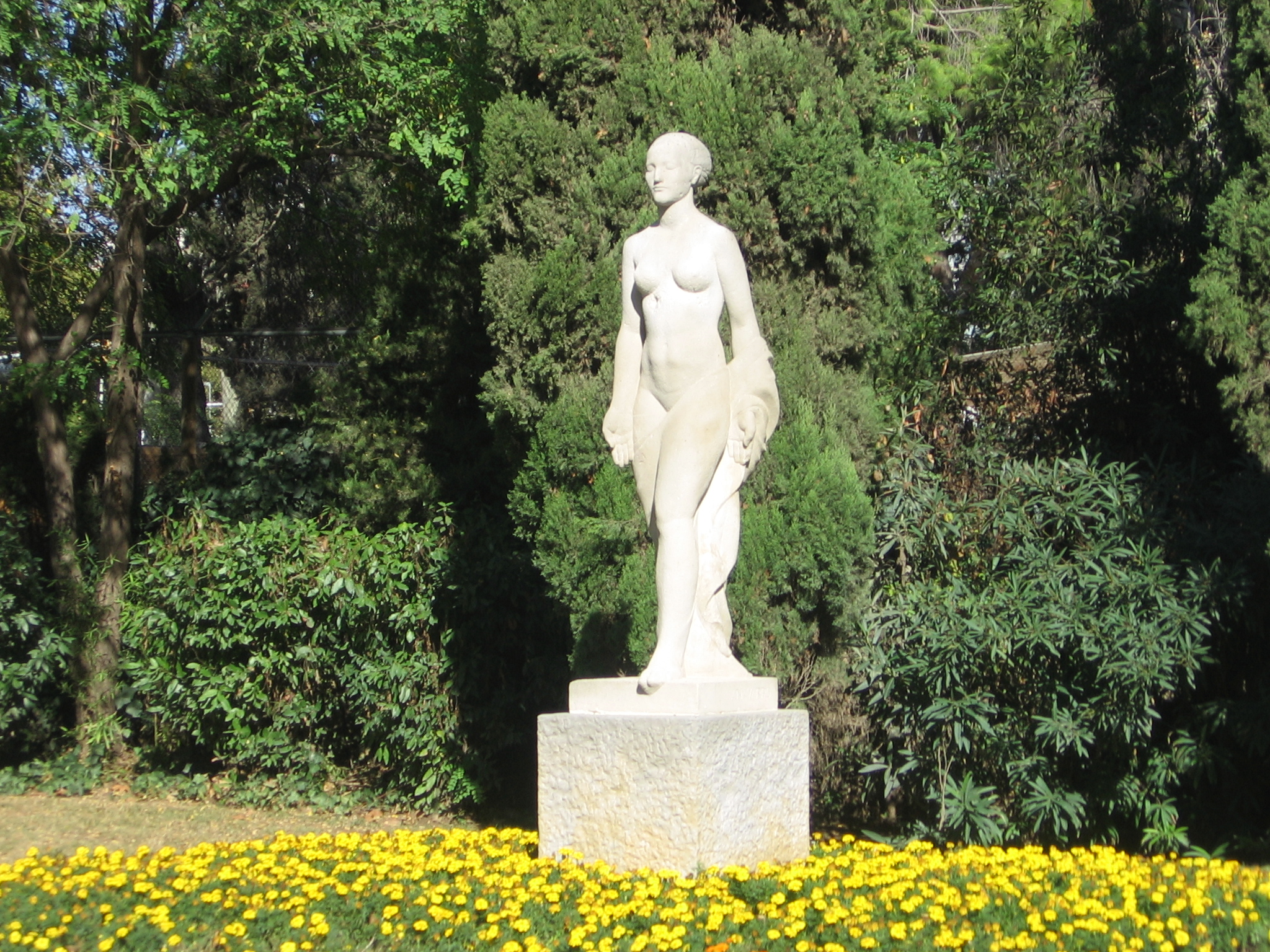
The night, de Vicente Navarro, parc de la Ciutadella.

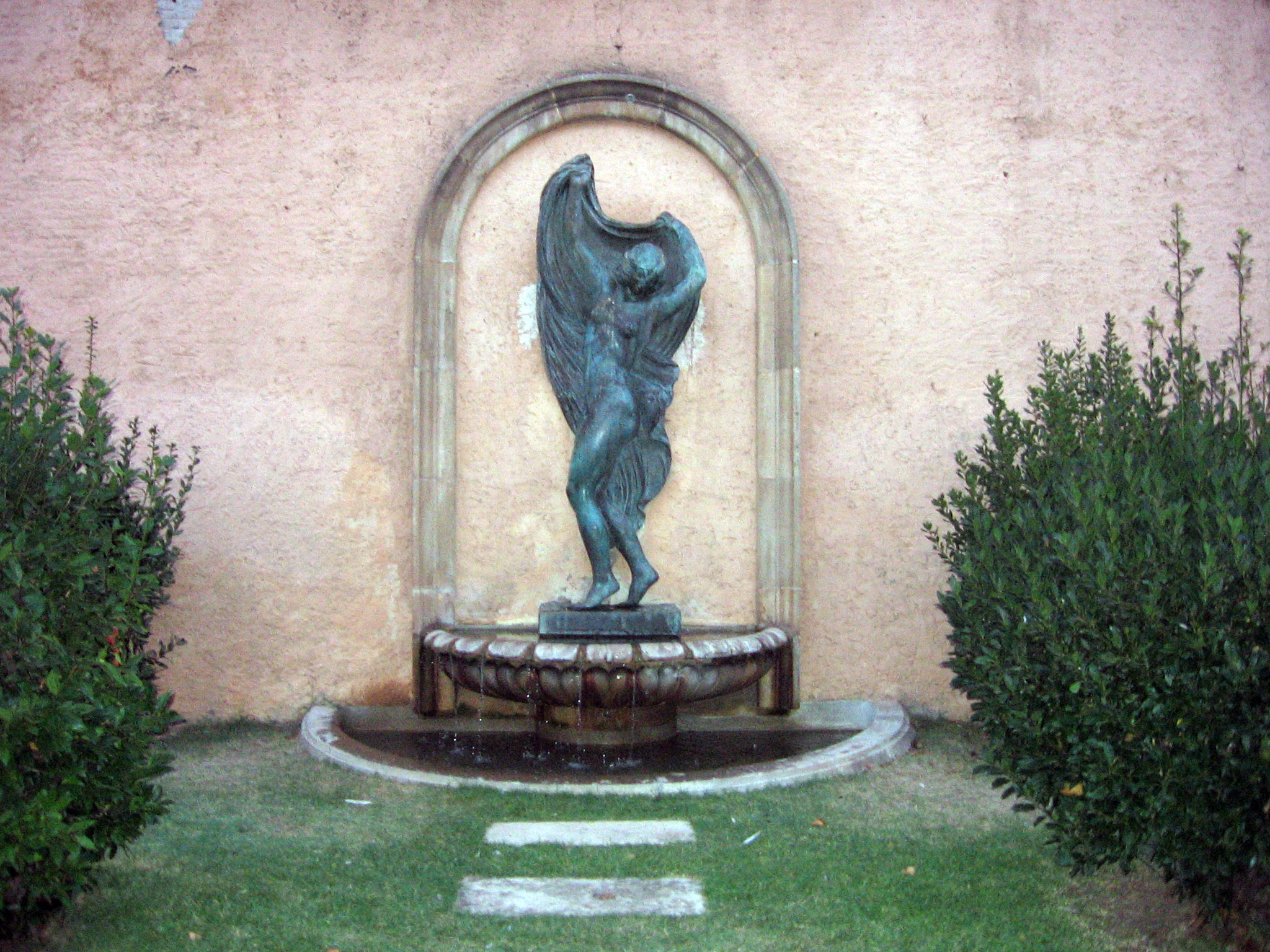
Marinada, de Antonio Alsina, jardins de l'Umbracle, Montjuic.

== Description ==
Plan of the square with the location of the sculptures.

The Catalonia Square has the shape of an irregular quadrilateral, wider on the southern side than on the northern side. On the mountain side, where the small temple designed by Nebot was to be located, a terrace was installed at a slightly higher level than the rest of the square, where the eight statues chosen from the sixteen originally planned for this place were placed, all in stone, located on pedestals or on the railings of the terrace, four facing the mountain (Maternity, by Navarro; Young Woman, by Dunyach; Shepherd with the Flute, by Gargallo; and Navigation, by Arnau), and four facing the sea (The Forger, by Llimona; Woman with Child and Piccolo, by Viladomat; Female Figure, by Casanovas; and Youth, by Clarà). On this terrace was located the fountain Niños cabalgando peces by Marès, moved in 1961 to the intersection of Gran Vía and Rambla de Cataluña, while in 1959 the ornamental fountains designed by Espiau were installed.

The rest of the sculptures, all in bronze, are distributed along an oval-shaped balustrade located inside the square, surrounded by oaks and surrounding the central mosaic of the square, which is usually populated by pigeons. They are located in pedestals or niches placed on high pillars of paired columns, of which there are two between each group placed on pedestal. These pillars also have reliefs with coats of arms of the Catalan capitals, work of Antoni Agramunt Marsal. The works are as follows, clockwise from the intersection between Paseo de Gracia and Ronda de Sant Pere: Barcelona, by Marès; Montserrat, by Arnau (mountain side), on the same pillar as Female Figure, by Llimona (sea side); Hercules, by Parera (mountain), placed with Woman with Angel, by Navarro (sea); Tarragona, by Otero; Fountain of the six putti, by Otero (facing the Portal of the Angel); Lérida, by Borrell; Woman with image of the Virgin, by Monjo (Besós side), on the pillar that forms a pair with The popular spirit, by Otero (Llobregat side); Eagle Shepherd, by Gargallo (Besós), located with Pomona, by Monjo (Llobregat); Wisdom, by Miquel Oslé; Work, by Llucià Oslé; Emporion, by Marès (sea side), on the reverse of Fisherman, by Tenas (mountain side); Woman, by Borrell (sea side), paired with Montseny, by Duran (mountain side); and Gerona, by Parera. Finally, in the southeast corner of the square, facing the Ramblas, was located inside a pond The goddess by Clarà; next to it was placed in 1991 the Monument to Francesc Macià by Subirachs.

Name	Author	Material	Dimensions	Description	Photo
Motherhood	Vicenç Navarro	Stone	2,73 x 0,92 x 1	It is one of the figures located on the upper terrace, of those that originally were to be in the pavilion designed by Nebot for the square. When this project was cancelled, it was left as a free-standing sculpture, located on a pedestal and facing the mountain side of the square. It is an allegory of motherhood, represented by a woman with a naked torso and a tunic that covers her from the waist down, holding a child in her arms. This theme was fashionable at the time, generally related to conservatism, not in vain it was an official commission from institutions that emanated from the dictatorship of Primo de Rivera. Navarro made two other works for the square, Woman with Angel and The Night, although the latter was finally installed in the Parc de la Ciutadella.	
Young	Josep Dunyach	Stone	2,78 x 0,85 x 0,70	Like the previous one, it is on the mountain side of the terrace, on a pedestal. It is a young girl dressed in a tunic tight under the chest, in an attitude of walking, whose movement makes her open the tunic and show her left leg. The shape of the girl is robust, following the aesthetic canon of Noucentisme, influenced by the Mediterranean sculpture of Aristide Maillol. Dunyach made another sculpture for the square, The Goddess, which was finally rejected and ended up in the Parc de la Ciutadella.	
The Forger	Josep Llimona	Stone	2,47 x 1,11 x 1,03	Located on the sea-facing side of the terrace, on a pedestal, this figure is the only one, along with The Goddess by Clarà, that was not created for the 1927 competition. The work dates from 1914, when it was awarded a prize at the Brussels International Art Exhibition. There are two bronze replicas of the same work, one located in the Plaza del Universo, within the grounds of the Montjuic Trade Fair, and another in the lobby of the School of Labor. The statue represents a bare-chested worker with an apron covering the lower part of his body, holding a hammer and a chisel in his hands. The style given to the figure is naturalistic, with a clear influence of the Belgian sculptor Constantin Meunier, so it differs from the rest of the set of the square, more markedly noucentista. Llimona executed two other female figures, one located in a niche in the square and another that was moved to the Royal Palace of Pedralbes.	
Woman with Child and Piccolo	Josep Viladomat	Stone	2,80 x 0,91 x 0,70	This work, also called Motherhood, is on the side of the terrace facing the sea. It is a semi-nude female figure, holding a flute or caramillo in her hands, while next to her is a child, also naked, and at her feet is a horn of plenty. The style used in this work is of a certain baroque style tempered by the classicist influence of the prevailing noucentisme, which is denoted in a more stylized figure than the rounded forms of the noucentista sculpture.	
Female figure	Enric Casanovas	Stone	2,81 x 1,08 x 0,80	On the sea side, like the previous one, is the figure of a woman with a naked torso who gathers her hair over her shoulder with her left hand. At her feet is a small dolphin. This work is part of Casanovas' usual Mediterranean style, which he combined with a certain archaic air that gave his works a stamp of virginal innocence. This sculptor elaborated another figure intended for the pavilion and planned for the square, but when it was not completed, it was placed in the Royal Palace of Pedralbes.	
Youth	Josep Clarà	Original made of sandstone, copy made of artificial stone	2,97 x 0,79 x 0,70	Located on the sea side, it represents a naked young woman covered only by a tunic from the belly down, with her arms raised and crossed on the nape of her neck. It is one of the most explicit nudes in the square, which is why it was the object of moralistic criticism. When he finished this work in 1928, Clarà sent it to the exhibition of the Salon des Tuileries in Paris, until its final placement in the square in 1929. This work was replaced by a copy in 1993, because as most of the sculptures on the terrace are made of Montjuic stone, as this one was made of sandstone, of lower quality, it was more eroded by the weather, especially by the water of the fountains next to it. Clarà was also the author of The Goddess square, as well as Fertility, which was located in the Miramar Gardens.	
Flute Shepherd	Pablo Gargallo	Original made of sandstone, copy made of artificial stone	2,70 x 0,90 x 0,90	Again on the mountain side, this work represents a shepherd playing a flute, while with his left hand he holds a sheep, and at his feet is a lamb. In this figure, of a realistic style and classical air, Gargallo moved away from his avant-garde production of those years, focused on experimentation with iron plates and geometric shapes, in a style with certain cubist reminiscences. For the plaza as a whole, he made another figure of a shepherd, the Eagle Shepherd, as well as The Grape Harvester, which was finally installed in the Miramar Gardens. This sculpture was replaced by a copy in 1993, as was the previous one. In the process of making the mold for the copy, a bronze replica was made and placed in the Plaza del Doctor Emili Mira, at the suggestion of Gargallo's daughter.	
Navigation	Eusebi Arnau	Stone	2,90 x 1,08 x 0,90	The last work on the terrace is oriented towards the mountains. It is an allegory of navigation, in the form of a matron dressed in a tunic and wearing a bonnet holding a rudder in her right hand. Of modernist formation, Arnau executed this work in a fully classicist style. This sculptor made another work for the square, Montserrat, as well as a Marina that was one of the discarded and finally placed in the Royal Palace of Pedralbes.	
Barcelona	Frederic Marès	Bronze	3,50 x 1,20 x 2,52	It is a group on pedestal, facing the Passeig de Gràcia / Ronda de Sant Pere intersection. It is one of the four dedicated to the Catalan provinces, one of the specific commissions for the 1927 competition. This set consists of a nude female figure seated on a horse, with her arms raised, in which she holds a boat; and, standing next to the horse, a half-naked man wearing a helmet with wings, and a cogwheel in his hand. From the winged helmet it can be deduced that this figure represents the god Hermes (Mercury for the Romans), who among other things used to allude to Commerce, while the cogwheel symbolizes Industry. The woman is an allegory of Navigation, so the whole of the work is a compendium of these three elements, as the fundamental engines on which the economy of the city has been based throughout its history. The metalwork was made by the Fundición Hijo de Esteban Barberí, of Olot. Marès made for the square another work entitled Emporion and a fountain called Niños cabalgando peces (Children riding fish), which was moved in 1961 to Gran Vía and Rambla de Cataluña.	
Montserrat	Eusebi Arnau	Bronze	2,25 x 1,07 x 0,60	This figure is located in a niche of the pillar facing the mountain on the Besós side of the square. Like the rest of the figures located in niches, it is a high relief, so it only presents the front part of the figure. The work represents a half-naked old man, probably the anchorite monk Joan Garí, holding in his right hand an image of the Virgin of Montserrat. On the pedestal is the coat of arms of Lérida. This work was cast in Codina Hermanos, Madrid.	
Female figure	Josep Llimona	Bronze	2,60 x 0,93 x 0,45	It is on the same pillar as the previous one. It is a figure of a woman without special attributes, leaning on the right foot and with the left leg bent, in contrapposto position. She is dressed with tunic and mantle, which she holds with her arms, one on her shoulder and the other on one breast, while the other breast comes out of her clothes. At the base is the coat of arms of Barcelona. The foundry of this work was Esteban Barberí (Olot).	
Hercules	Antonio Parera	Bronze	2,65 x 1,31 x 0,50	It is located on the pilaster facing the sea, on the Besós side of the square. It represents the mythological hero Hercules, half-naked, with a cloak on his back, one of the folds of which covers his genitals. His arms are raised, holding a stone. The presence of this figure may allude to Jacinto Verdaguer's work La Atlántida, since according to the author, the demigod was the founder of Barcelona. In its lower part is the coat of arms of Gerona. It was cast by Gabriel Bechini (Barcelona).	
Mujer con ángel	Vicenç Navarro	Bronze	2,66 x 0,97 x 0,40	This work is on the reverse side of the previous one. It shows a semi-nude woman holding the figure of an angel in her arms, with a classical treatment of the forms. Navarro was fond of angels, which he often included in his works. Below the sculpture is the coat of arms of Tarragona. It was cast in Tanagra-M. Gimeno (Blanes).	
Tarragona	Jaume Otero	Bronze	2,45 x 1,46 x 1,98	This group is located in front of the intersection of Fontanella and Portal del Angel. It is one of the four dedicated to the Catalan provinces that Otero first made in stone, until he was asked to make them in bronze —the stone version was placed on the Avenida Diagonal, in front of the Royal Palace of Pedralbes.— The group consists of a seated man, a teenage girl with a basket of fruit and three women, two standing and one seated. There are also references to the Mediterranean in the form of a fish and a fisherman's net. The style is decidedly classical, with a certain stylization of forms and a taste for ornamentation. Foundry: Gabriel Bechini (Barcelona).	
Six Putti Fountain	Jaume Otero	Bronze	3,90 x 23,20 x 8,16	Built in 1926, it was the first sculptural element placed in the square. It faces the Portal del Ángel. It is a fountain with a small waterfall, decorated, as its title indicates, with six figures of putti or little lovebirds, four around the fountain and two under arches at the top. On the back wall, the birth of Venus is represented in the central arch of the wall, flanked by two smaller ones. Venus is depicted in the form of a venera with two intertwined fish, and the two putti flanking her carry baskets of fruit. The fountain cascades into three successive basins, the upper two of which are decorated with foam, representing the blood of Uranus, who, by fertilizing the foam of the sea, gave birth to Venus; the lower basin closes the whole with baroque moldings. The four lower putti flank two vases and also carry baskets of fruit. For this work, Otero had the collaboration of Miquel Paredes. Foundry: Gabriel Bechini (Barcelona).	
Lérida	Joan Borrell	Bronze	2,83 x 1,60 x 2,60	It is located on a pedestal next to the previous fountain, facing the Portal del Angel. This group was originally commissioned to Manuel Fuxá, who made it in stone, but after it was decided that all the works of the square would be in bronze, it had to be repeated and, unlike what happened with the Tarragona group, which was commissioned to the same artist, in this case they changed the artist and awarded it to Borrell; Fuxá's work ended in the Diagonal Avenue, in front of the Royal Palace of Pedralbes. This group is an allegory of Lérida, formed by two standing women, one with a sleeping child at her feet, and another sitting with two children on her lap. The figures have no iconographic connection with the subject, so it seems that when the artist received the commission, he presented something he had already planned. Foundry: Codina Hermanos (Madrid).	
Woman with image of the Virgin	Enric Monjo	Bronze	2,30 x 0,95 x 0,50	It is located on the pillar facing the Besós, on the sea side of the plaza. This work, also known as Pomona, depicts a woman of classical appearance, dressed in a tight tunic with braided hair, holding in one hand an image of the Virgin, whose title is not identified. Monjo, a specialist in religious imagery, gives this image an academic treatment in which the contrapposto posture of the figure recalls classical Greek statuary. On the pedestal is the coat of arms of Gerona. Foundry: Codina Hermanos (Madrid).	
The popular Spirit	Jaume Otero	Bronze	2,15 x 1 x 0,40	Placed on the same column as the previous one, it represents a woman with her right arm raised holding a laurel wreath, while with her left hand she holds her tunic at her waist. Although the title suggests an allegory, the iconography is confusing. The stylization of the figure and a certain artifice give this work an air of Art Deco. On the base is the coat of arms of Barcelona. Foundry: Gabriel Bechini (Barcelona).	
Shepherd with eagle	Pablo Gargallo	Bronze	2,70 x 0,98 x 0,50	It is on the pilaster facing the Llobregat, on the sea side of the square. As in the other work by this artist on the upper terrace of the square, it is a shepherd with his arm raised in front of an eagle that is harassing a lamb at his feet. The treatment of the figure follows the classical canons, although a more avant-garde formal treatment can be seen, not in vain, Gargallo followed a line closer to Cubism at that time. The coat of arms of Tarragona can be seen at the bottom. Foundry: Codina Hermanos (Madrid).	
Pomona	Enric Monjo	Bronze	2,22 x 1,10 x 0,80	Located in the same place as the previous one, it is a personification of the Roman goddess Pomona, bearer of fruits and gardens. It is a female figure, dressed in a tunic, holding a string of fruits on her back. The robust forms of the figure are fully Noucentist, although the decorativeness of the whole is close to the Art Deco style. In an earlier sketch by Monjo, this figure was called El llano del Llobregat. The figure is accompanied by the coat of arms of Lérida.	
Wisdom	Miquel Oslé	Bronze	3,20 x 1,56 x 2,90	This group is located on the sea side, facing the Ramblas, flanking the Goddess of Clarà next to the allegory of Work by Miquel's brother, Llucià. The work is an allegory of Wisdom, formed by a female figure representing the goddess of this quality, Minerva, dressed in a tunic with an aegis on her chest, holding a helmet in her right hand, while with her left hand she holds the bridle of a rearing horse that raises its legs to crush a snake, symbol of ignorance. Foundry: Mir y Ferrero (Madrid).	
Goddess	Josep Clarà	Marble	1,45 x 0,65 x 0,82	Also known as The Enigma, this work is located in a pond facing the Ramblas and was a direct commission to the author outside of the 1927 competition. In fact, the work was executed according to an original model from 1911. Placed in the square in September 1928, it was strongly criticized by the moralist sectors because it was a nude, so it was removed after three days; however, it was reinstalled on May 19, 1929, one day before the inauguration of the International Exposition, where it remained permanently. The figure represents a sitting nude woman, with one leg with the knee bent on the ground and the other, also bent, raised to the chest, while the left arm rests on the knee of this leg, the hand is placed on the shoulder and the head rests on it. The facial expression is introspective, meditative or doubtful, hence the nickname "enigma". The anatomy of the figure is round, sensual, in full harmony with the Noucentist Mediterraneanism in vogue at the time. It is Clarà's masterpiece, and over time it has become one of the most representative symbols of Barcelona. In 1982 this work was moved to the lobby of the Barcelona City Hall and replaced by a copy by Ricard Sala. In 1991, the Monument to Francesc Macià by Josep Maria Subirachs was placed next to this statue.	
Work	Llucià Oslé	Bronze	3,45 x 1,25 x 3,70	Located in the direction of the Ramblas, flanking the Goddess next to the allegory of Wisdom, this work, like that of his brother Miquel, presents a group formed by a horse and a human figure, in this case a naked worker with a hammer in his hand. The Oslé brothers were close to social realism at the time, with works in which workers were often the protagonists. They often worked together, so their works are often difficult to attribute to one or the other. Foundry: Mir y Ferrero (Madrid).	
Emporion	Frederic Marès	Bronze	2,47 x 1,10 x 0,50	It is located in a niche in the pillar facing the sea, on the Llobregat side of the square. It is an allegory of the Greek city of Emporion (Ampurias), represented by a woman dressed in a tight tunic that leaves one breast uncovered, with her left arm holding a jug. Marès was one of the few sculptors who adhered to the original objective of dedicating the sculptures in the square to Catalan places. On the pedestal is the coat of arms of Gerona.	
Fisherman	Josep Tenas	Bronze	2,30 x 1,30 x 0,50	Located in a niche of the previous pillar, it represents a half-naked fisherman carrying a parihuela with fish on his back, while at his feet is a dolphin-like fish. Fishing has historically been one of the basic activities of the Catalan economy, one of the leitmotifs of the plaza, while it links the Mediterranean theme so much to the taste of Noucentisme. The figure is sober and emphatic, in the style of the works of Tenas, who was strongly influenced by the French sculptor Antoine Bourdelle. It bears the coat of arms of Barcelona. Foundry: Tanagra-M. Gimeno (Blanes).	
Montseny	Jaume Duran	Bronze	2,80 x 0,90 x 0,50	Placed on the pillar facing the mountain on the Llobregat side of the square, it is again a territorial allegory, in this case the Montseny massif. However, the figure does not seem to be related to this representation, since it is a young woman dressed in a shirt and long skirt, a modernity that clashes with the classical air of most of the figures in the square, with a branch in her right hand and a veil over her head in her left. Below the figure is the coat of arms of Tarragona. Foundry: Codina Hermanos (Madrid).	
Woman	Joan Borrell	Bronze	2,23 x 0,85 x 0,55	This figure is paired with the previous one. It is a woman dressed in a tunic, with her face in profile —the only one in the square—, which allows one to better appreciate her hairstyle, a classic braid. Her anatomy is marked by the robustness of her legs, a formal characteristic of Borrell's work. The position of the figure is reminiscent of the Venus pudica, although this type of representation is usually a nude, which is not the case here. The style of the work oscillates between classicism and art deco. It shows the coat of arms of Lérida. Foundry: Mir y Ferrero (Madrid).	
Gerona	Antonio Parera	Bronze	2,92 x 1,72 x 3,85	This group on pedestal is facing the university round, closing the sculptural cycle of the square. It is an allegory of Gerona, the fourth of the Catalan provinces represented in the square. In this case it is symbolized in an agricultural allegory, represented by an ox with two women on one side, one seated and the other standing holding a basket with agricultural products; and a man and a woman on the other side, the female figure seated and the male standing. All the figures are naked, which emphasizes the classicism of the scene. Foundry: Gabriel Bechini (Barcelona).	
Monument to Francesc Macià	Josep Maria Subirachs	Travertine, concrete, iron and bronze	9,11 x 3,66 x 7,95	Installed in 1991, this monument was the last sculpture placed in the square to date. It faces the Ramblas, next to Clarà's Goddess. In honor of the president of the Generalitat Francesc Macià, Subirachs conceived the work as an evocation of the various symbols of Catalan identity: the pedestal, made of travertine with a succession of blocks of stone in a break, represents the history of Catalonia; the upper part, made of concrete, is shaped like an inverted staircase, of which the first three steps, embedded in the pedestal, represent the three years of Macià's government at the head of the Generalitat, while the rest, ending abruptly and unfinished, symbolize the future of the country, which is being built day by day, step by step; Also, on the pedestal there are several inscriptions in the form of graffiti, with names, dates and places related to the Catalan politician, while at the top is in large letters the inscription Catalunya a Francesc Macià (Catalonia to Francesc Macià). On the back is the coat of arms of Catalonia, made of iron, and is engraved with a phrase of the president addressed to the Catalan deputies in 1932. In front of the body of the monument there is a separate monolith with the bust of President Macià, made in bronze, a replica of the portrait made by Josep Clarà in 1932. Subirachs wanted to give it a realistic air, which contrasts with the almost abstraction of the rest of the monument, to have a link with the noucentist style of the rest of the square. Foundry: Parellada (Lliçà d'Amunt).	

== See also ==
- Public art in Barcelona
- 1929 Barcelona International Exposition

== Bibliography ==
- Fabre, Jaume; Huertas, Josep M.; Bohigas, Pere (1984). Monuments de Barcelona (in Catalan). Barcelona: L'Avenç. ISBN 84-85905-21-0.
- Grandas, M. Carmen (1988). L'Exposició Internacional de Barcelona de 1929 (in Catalan). Sant Cugat del Vallès: Els llibres de la frontera. ISBN 84-85709-68-3.
- Lecea, Ignasi de; Fabre, Jaume; Grandas, Carme; Huertas, Josep M.; Remesar, Antoni; Sobrequés, Jaume (2009). Art públic de Barcelona (in Catalan). Barcelona: Ayuntamiento de Barcelona y Àmbit Serveis Editorials. ISBN 978-84-96645-08-0.
- Permanyer, Lluís (1995). Biografia de la Plaça de Catalunya (in Catalan). Barcelona: La Campana. ISBN 84-88791-14-3.
- Roig, Josep L. (1995). Historia de Barcelona. Barcelona: Primera Plana. ISBN 84-8130-039-X.
