= Busquets =

Busquets is a Catalan surname. Notable people with the surname include:

- Carles Busquets, Spanish footballer (Barcelona), father of Sergio Busquets
- Florencia Busquets, Argentine volleyball player
- Guillem Busquets, Spanish architect (es:Guillem Busquets)
- Jaume Busquets, Spanish sculptor and painter
- Joan Busquets Grau, Spanish architect and urban planner
- Joan Busquets i Jané, Spanish interior decorator (es:Joan Busquets i Jané)
- Joan Busquets Queralt, Spanish trade unionist and political activist (es:Joan Busquets Queralt)
- Joaquín Busquets, Mexican actor, father of Narciso Busquets (es:Joaquín Busquets)
- Julio Busquets, Spanish soldier and legislator (es:Julio Busquets)
- Miguel Busquets, Chilean footballer
- Narciso Busquets, Mexican actor, son of Joaquín Busquets
- Ricardo Busquets, Puerto Rican Olympic swimmer
- Sergio Busquets, Spanish professional football player, son of Carles Busquets
- Oriol Busquets, Spanish football player
