= Llambi =

Llambi is a surname. Notable people with the surname include:

- Jaume Llambi Riera (born 1974), Spanish wheelchair basketball player and table tennis player
- Jorge Llambi (born 1939), Argentine equestrian
- Ricard Canals Llambi (1876-1931), Spanish painter
- Sllave Llambi (1919–1985), Albanian football player and coach
