= Charles Suckling =

British chemist

Charles Walter Suckling CBE FRS (24 July 1920 – 31 October 2013) was a British chemist who first synthesised halothane, a volatile inhalational anaesthetic in 1951, while working at the Imperial Chemical Industries (ICI) Central Laboratory in Widnes.

== Biography ==
He was born in Teddington, London in 1920, the son of Edward Ernest and Barbara (née Thomson) Suckling, and educated at Oldershaw Grammar School, Wallasey and Liverpool University.

He worked, initially as a research chemist, for ICI from 1942 to 1982, becoming Deputy Chairman of Mond Division in 1969 and Chairman of Paints Division in 1972, finally being appointed General Manager of Research in 1977 (until retirement in 1982). He was elected a Fellow of the Royal Society in 1978.

He married Eleanor Margaret Watterson in 1946; they had two sons and a daughter. He died on 31 October 2013.

== Halothane research ==
At the time of Suckling's original research, the most common inhalational anaesthetics in use were chloroform and diethyl ether, both of which had several serious drawbacks. Chloroform was toxic to the liver, while diethyl ether was highly flammable.

The halogenated alkanes in general, and in particular the fluorinated compounds were promising because they were volatile but not flammable. Suckling had worked on such compounds extensively during World War II, when they were used in the production of high-octane aviation fuel, and in the purification of uranium-235. He proceeded to synthesise a variety of fluorinated hydrocarbons before evaluating them for anaesthetic properties. He liaised closely with clinicians, initially in setting target physicochemical properties for ideal agents and then later in evaluating the developed compounds.

Suckling first investigated halothane's anaesthetic action by experimenting on mealworms and houseflies, and then forwarded it to Jaume Raventos, a pharmacologist, for evaluation of anaesthesia in other animals. After Raventos established its pharmacological properties, it was given to Michael Johnstone, an anaesthetist in Manchester, England, who recognised its great advantages over the other anaesthetics available and established its first clinical trial in 1956. This process of systematic study of chemical compounds with a set of pre-defined characteristics has been identified as one of the first examples of modern drug design.
