= Pablo Gargallo =

Spanish painter

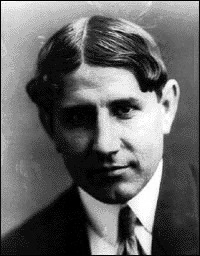
Pablo Gargallo in 1910

Pablo Emilio or Pau Emili Gargallo (5 January 1881 – 28 December 1934), known simply as Pau or Pablo Gargallo, was a Spanish sculptor and painter.

== Life and career ==
Born in Maella, Aragon, he moved to Barcelona, with his family in 1888, where he would begin his training in the arts. Gargallo developed a style of sculpture based on the creation of three-dimensional objects from pieces of flat metal plate, and he also used paper or cardboard. Some of these sculptures have a form of cubism. For example, only one half of a face may be shown, and it may have only one eye. He also made more traditional sculptures in bronze, marble and other materials.

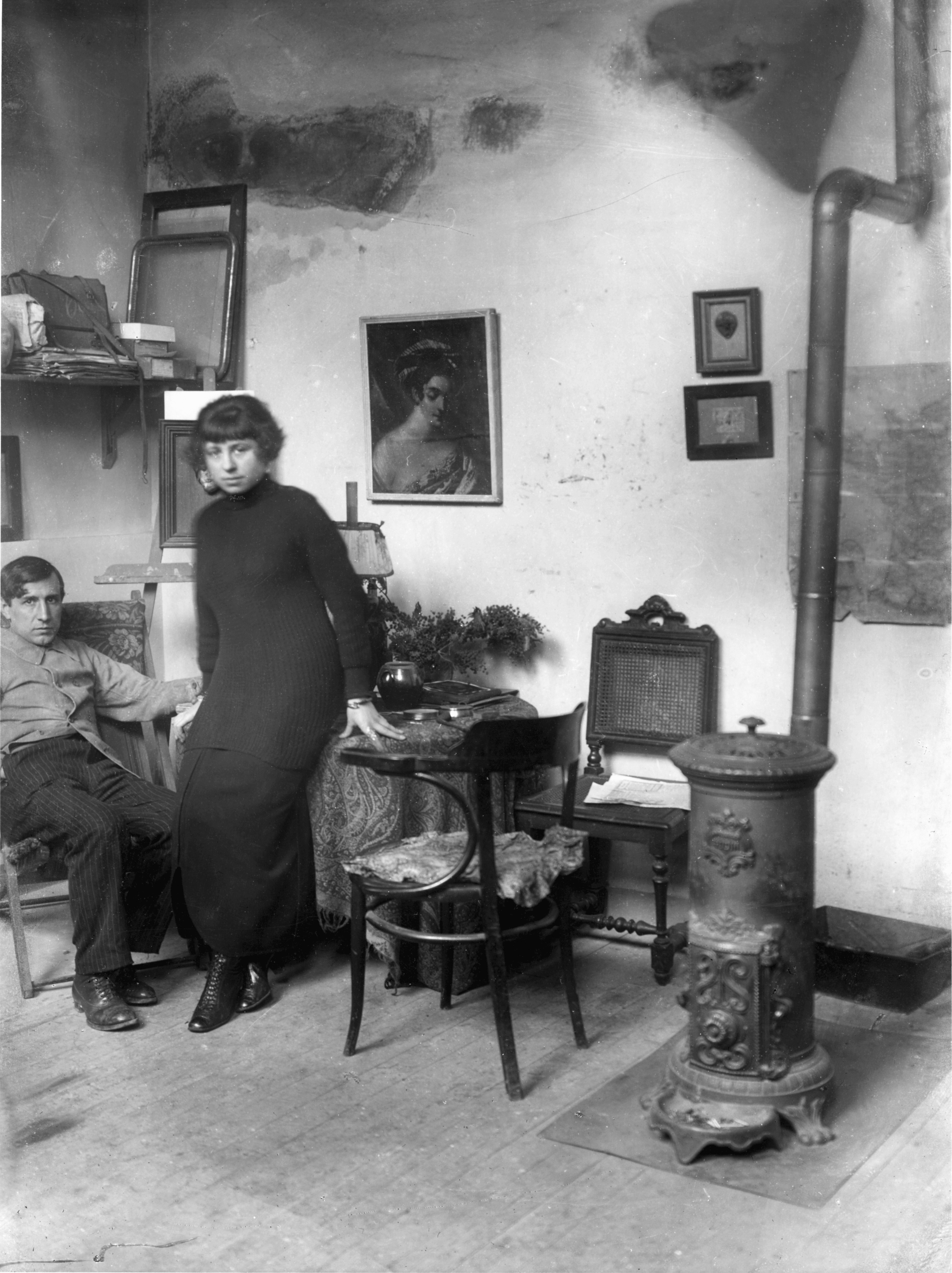
Pablo and Magali Gargallo in 1913, 45 rue Blomet, Paris

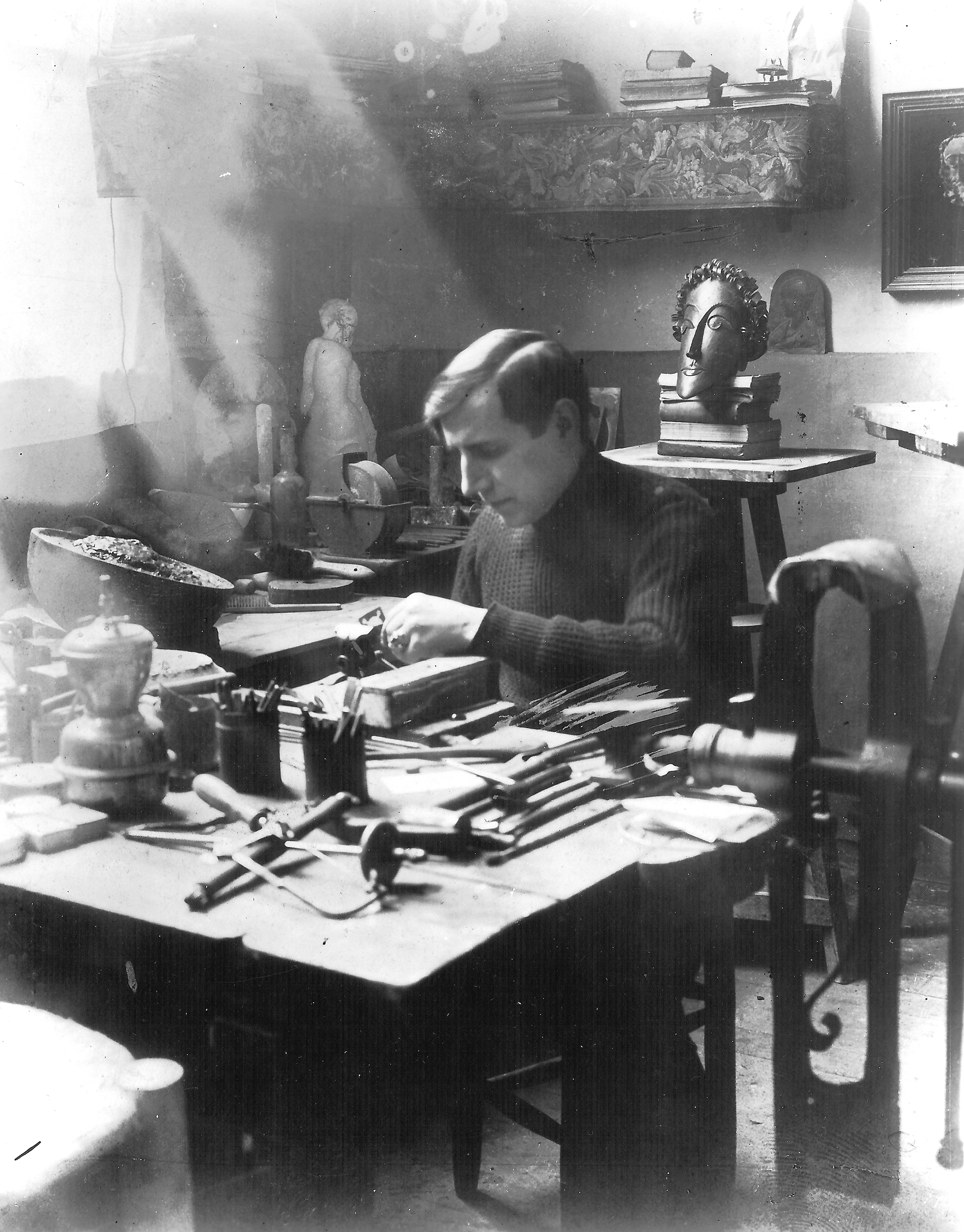
Pablo Gargallo, 1915, in his studio at 45 rue Blomet

He spent a significant part of his life in the Montparnasse Quarter of Paris, France. In 1903, he invested a studio at the Cité d'Artistes, rue Vercingétorix in the 14th arrondissement of Paris. There he met Max Jacob and Carlos Casagemas, both friends of Pablo Picasso.

In 1907, he stayed at the artists commune Le Bateau-Lavoir in Montmartre with Max Jacob, Juan Gris and other artists. He spent his first night in the studio of his friend Picasso, whose head he modeled as a sculpture. There he was able to contemplate Picasso's seminal proto-Cubist painting Les Demoiselles d'Avignon. Shortly thereafter, Juan Gris introduced him to Magali Tartanson, whom he married in 1915. During this period, Gargallo was influenced by the work of Picasso.

Among Gargallo's works are three pieces based on Greta Garbo: "Masque de Greta Garbo à la mèche," "Tête de Greta Garbo avec chapeau," and "Masque de Greta Garbo aux cils." Together with Dídac Masana, Gargallo sculpted the great arch over the front of the stage of the Palau de la Música Catalana in Barcelona. The work depicts the Ride of the Valkyries in Richard Wagner's opera Die Walküre (The Valkyries).

Gargallo suffered from fulminating bronchial pneumonia and died in Reus, Tarragona. He is considered to be one of the most significant artists of the Spanish avant-garde, and in 1985 the Pablo Gargallo Museum in Zaragoza opened in the former Argillo Palace. Gargallo's birthplace and early home, on the street now dedicated to his name in Maella, Zaragosa, has been transformed into a museum dedicated to his life and works.

== Gallery ==
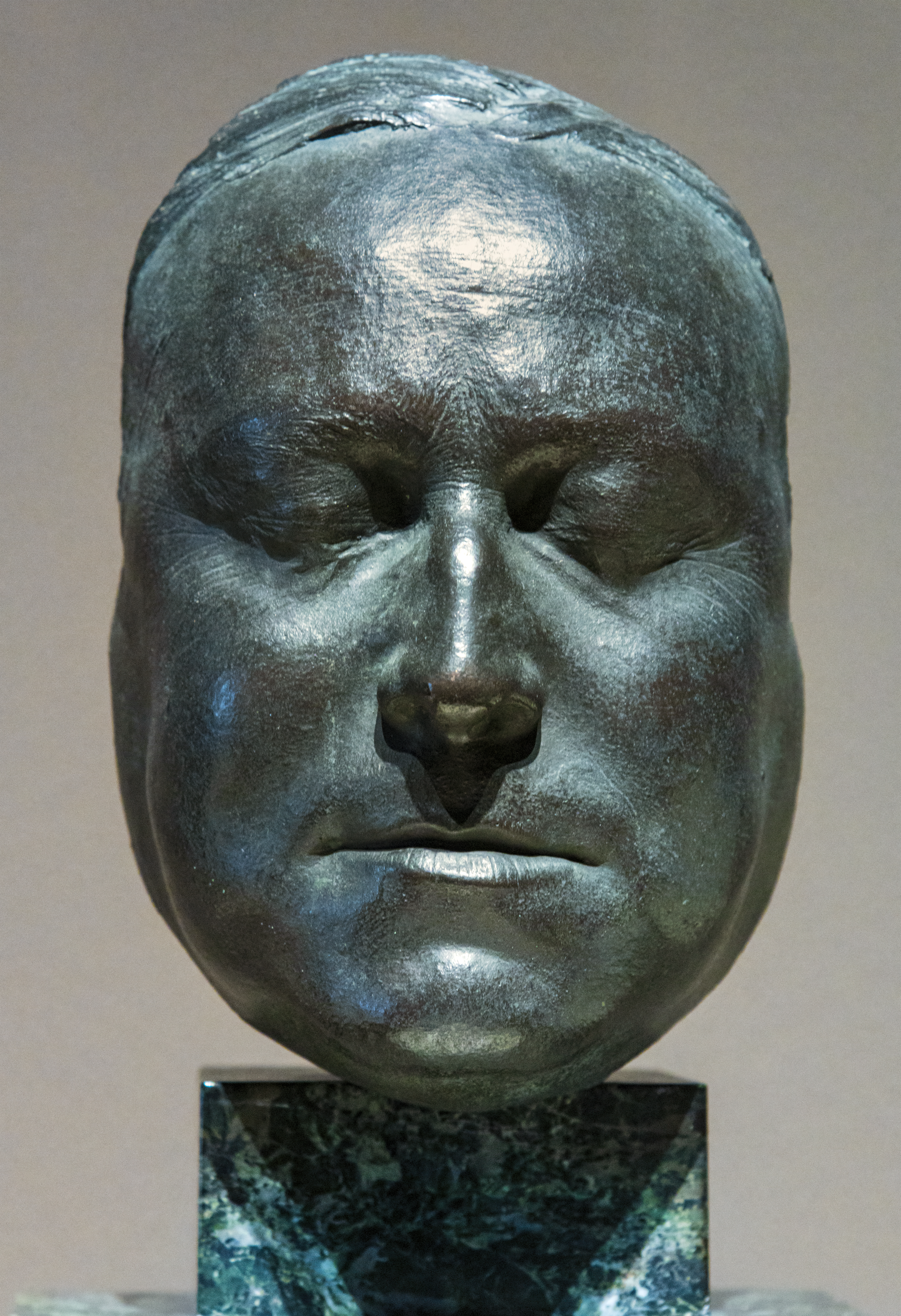
Isidre Nonell, bronze, 1911, MNAC

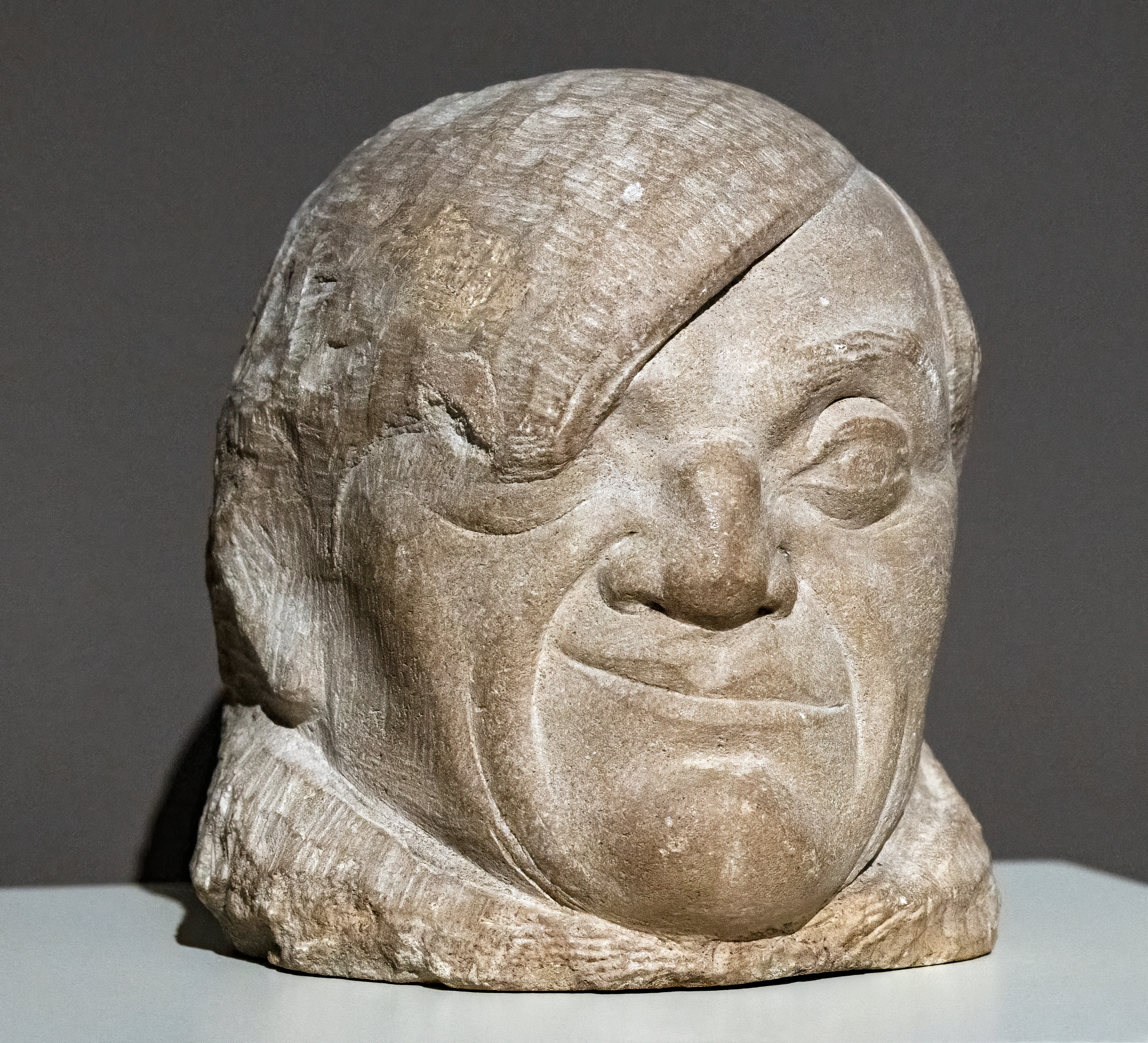
Portrait of Picasso, stone, 1913, MNAC

Picasso’s Mask, 1913, Centre Pompidou

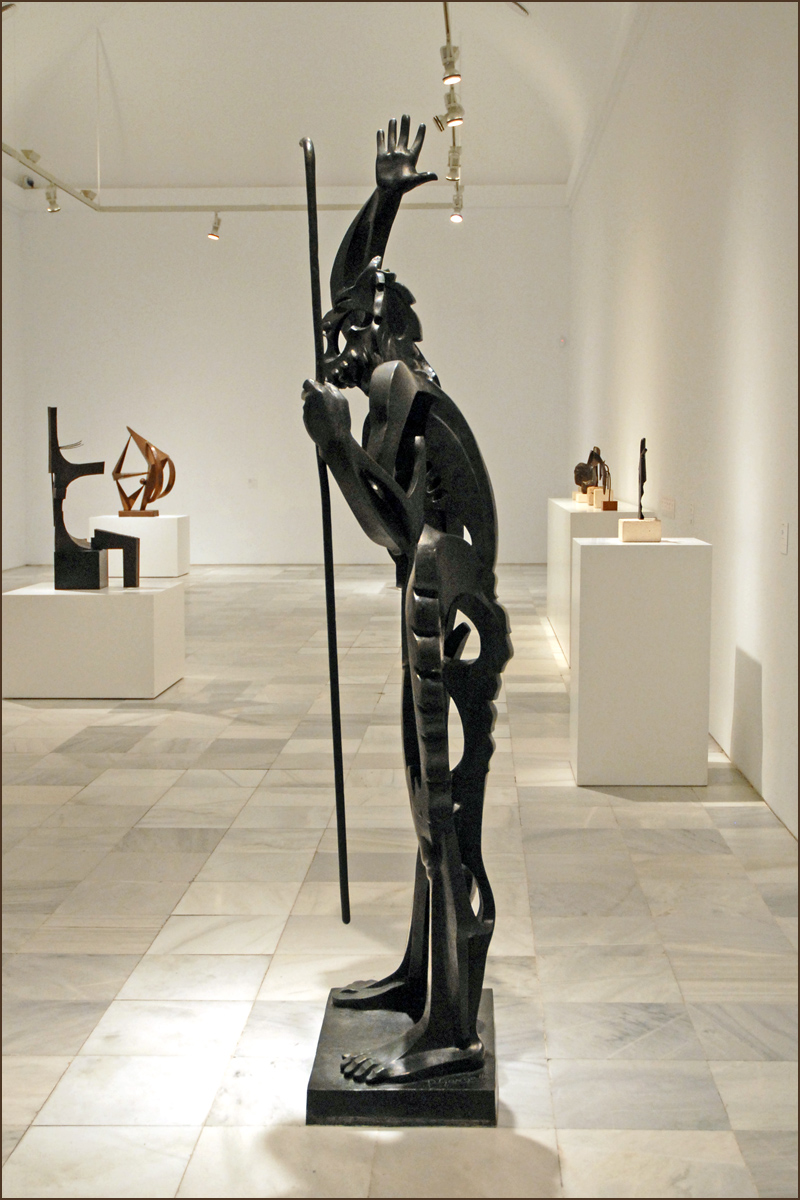
Prophet, bronze, 1933, MNCARS

== See also ==
- Sculptures in Plaça de Catalunya
