= Jaume Blassi =

Spanish photographer (born 1948)

- Born: 1948 (age 77–78)
- Occupation: Photographer

Jaume Blassi (born 1948) is a Spanish photographer.

Their work is included in the collections of Museo Reina Sofia, Madrid, the Metropolitan Museum of Art, the Detroit Institute of Arts, and the Museum of Fine Arts Houston.

Jaume and his twin brother Jordi were the subject of an exhibition at the Museo de Arte Abstracto Español, Cuenca from 10 October 2024 - 26 January 2025.
