= Jaume March =

Jaume March may refer to:

- Jaume March I, see Arnau March
- Jaume March II (1334x1335–1410), Catalan language poet
