= Jaume Raventos =

Catalan scientist and pharmacologist

Jaume Raventós i Pijoan (1905-1982) was a Catalan scientist and pharmacologist.

As a refugee from Franco's Spain he worked in Edinburgh and Manchester. Intimately involved in the characterisation of Halothane (or Fluothane) in conjunction with Charles Suckling. Known as James Raventos in the UK. In the period 1928-1933 he worked in Barcelona with August Pi i Sunyer and Francesc Domènech i Alsina.

Hervas, C (November 1992). "Approach to the scientific work of Jaume Raventos (1905-1982)". Rev Esp Anestesiol Reanim. 39 (6): 362–70. PMID 1293654.
