= Jaume d'Agramunt =

Spanish physician and writer

Jaume D’Agramunt was a Catalan medical doctor and writer, who died in Lleida, Catalonia, Spain in 1350.

In the face of the incredible toll taken across Europe by the Black Plague, on April 23, 1348, he provided the Mayor of Lleida with his Regiment de preservacio de pestilència (Directions for Protection from the Plague), considered the very first medical text written in Catalan. The text provides a detailed explanation of the illness, based on the natural philosophy beliefs of the time, including a strong astrological component, and supposed ways of protecting oneself. Shortly thereafter, Agramunt himself was one of the first victims when the Plague razed Lleida.
