= Jaume Cuadrat =

Catalan writer

Jaume Cuadrat i Realp (1899 in l'Albagés – 1993 in Barcelona) was a Catalan writer in both Catalan and French languages.

He lost his mother when he was a child and he started publishing his writings thanks to his father's sister, Rosa.

He trained to be a teacher in Lleida and he worked as a teacher before he went into exile in Marseilles, France after the Spanish Civil War, where he was a Spanish language teacher in Nice. He also collaborated with magazines such as Magisteri català.

== Novels ==
- La semence de liberté: ou la vie d'un Instituteur espagnol parmi la misère et le fanatisme des Maragatos, 1961
- Les faux célibataires, 1962
- Sacrifiée ou la guerre civile espagnole, 1965
