= Jaume Camps i Rovira =

Spanish lawyer and politician (1944–2022)

Member of the Parliament of Catalonia
- In office 10 April 1980 – 28 April 2005
- Succeeded by: Meritxell Borràs
- Constituency: Barcelona

Personal details
- Born: 9 November 1944 Barcelona, Spain
- Died: 2 December 2022 (aged 78)
- Party: CDC
- Education: University of Barcelona
- Occupation: Lawyer

Jaume Camps i Rovira (9 November 1944 – 2 December 2022) was a Spanish lawyer and politician. A member of the Democratic Convergence of Catalonia, he served in the Parliament of Catalonia from 1980 to 2005.

== Biography ==
Graduated in law from the University of Barcelona and holding a diploma in tax and financial studies, he was a member of the Democratic Student Union and, during the last years of the Franco regime, defended politicians tried in military courts and before the Public Order Tribunal. Later, he worked in a law firm specializing in commercial law, foreign investments, and exchange control.

He joined Convergència Democràtica de Catalunya in 1975, a party for which he was a representative in the Assembly of Catalonia and the Council of Political Forces of Catalonia. He was vice president of the United Nations Association in Spain.

He was elected as a deputy for CiU in the Parliament of Catalonia, serving seven legislatures, from the 1980 Catalan parliamentary elections until 2003, where he was the CiU spokesperson in the Commission for the Organization and Administration of the Generalitat and Local Government. In 1989, he chaired the commission that for the first time voted on a resolution recognizing Catalonia's right to self-determination. In 2004, he resigned from his seat and was proposed by CiU as a member of the Consultative Council.

Camps died on 2 December 2022, at the age of 78.
