= Jaume Sobregrau =

Spanish footballer

Personal information
- Full name: Jaume Sobregrau Mitjans
- Date of birth: 4 September 1986 (age 40)
- Place of birth: Barcelona, Spain
- Height: 1.80 m (5 ft 11 in)
- Position: Right back

Youth career
- 1994–1996: Damm
- 1996–2004: Barcelona

Senior career*
Years	Team	Apps	(Gls)
2004–2005	Cádiz B		
2005–2007	Albacete B		
2007–2008	Pobla Mafumet	37	(2)
2008–2009	Huesca	9	(0)
2009–2010	Barcelona B	7	(0)
2010–2011	San Roque	34	(1)
2011–2012	Lleida Esportiu	28	(2)
2012–2013	Badalona	26	(0)
2013–2014	Reus	35	(1)
2014–2016	Murcia	66	(0)
2017–2019	Fuenlabrada	44	(0)
- * Club domestic league appearances and goals

Jaume Sobregrau Mitjans (born 4 September 1986) is a Spanish former footballer who played as a right back.
