= Portal de l'Àngel =

Thoroughfare in Barcelona, Spain

Coordinates: 41°23′12″N 2°10′19″E

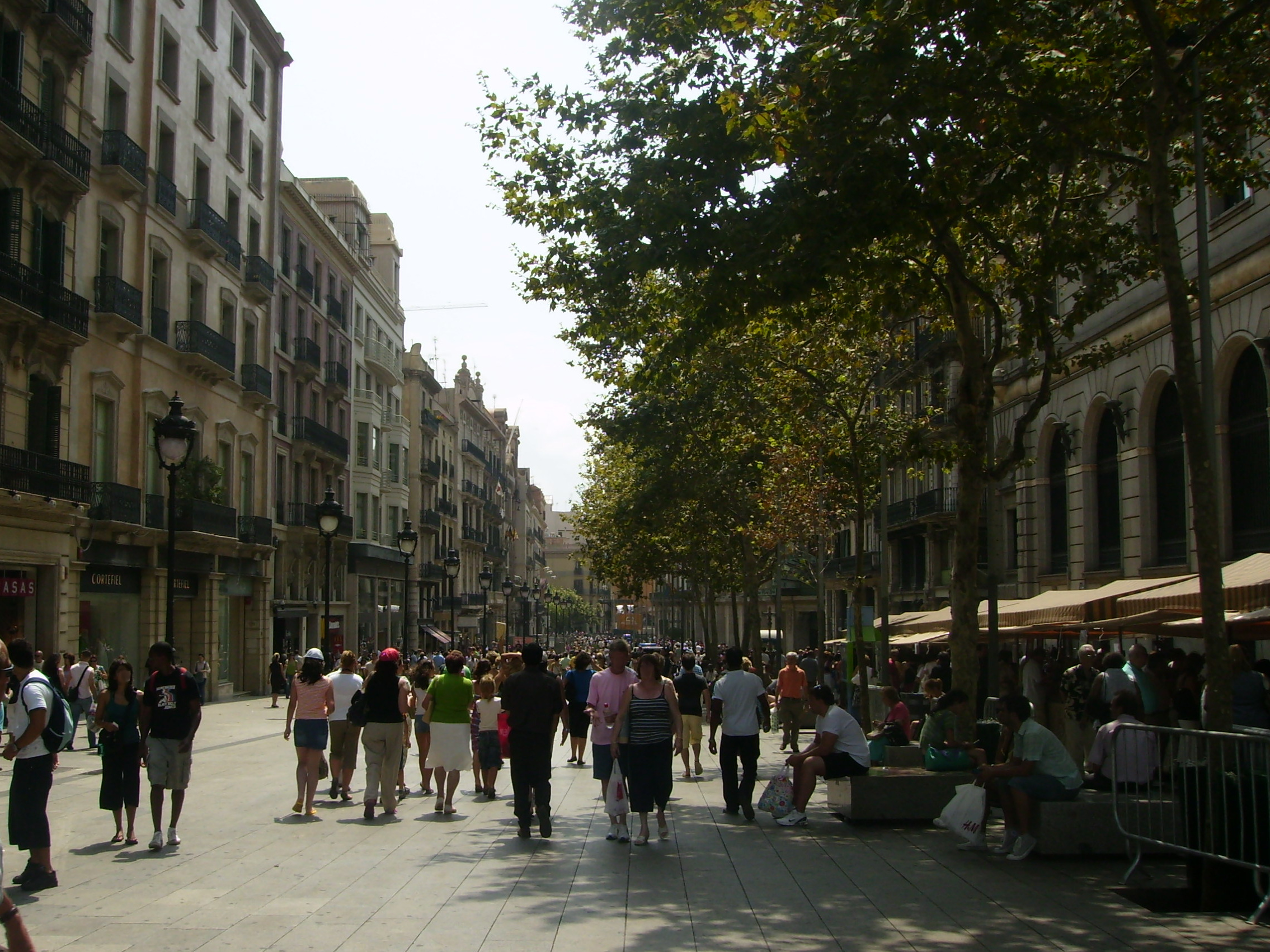
Portal de l'Àngel

Portal de l'Àngel (Catalan pronunciation: [puɾˈtal də ˈlaɲʒəl]) is a pedestrian street in the Ciutat Vella district of Barcelona adjacent to Plaça Catalunya and part of the large shopping area that spans from Avinguda Diagonal to Barri Gòtic. It's one of the city's most visited streets and is always crowded with tourists and locals all year round.

Portal de l'Àngel is noteworthy for being the most expensive street in Spain, with an average rental price of €265 per square meter in 2013.

It's home to some international shopping brands, including Zara, Massimo Dutti, and Benetton.

== Transport ==
- Barcelona metro
  - Catalunya (L1, L3, L6, L7), S1, S2, S5, S55, R1, R2, R4, R7 and regional trains.

== See also ==
- List of leading shopping streets and districts by city
