= Jaume Sanllorente =

Spanish journalist (born 1976)

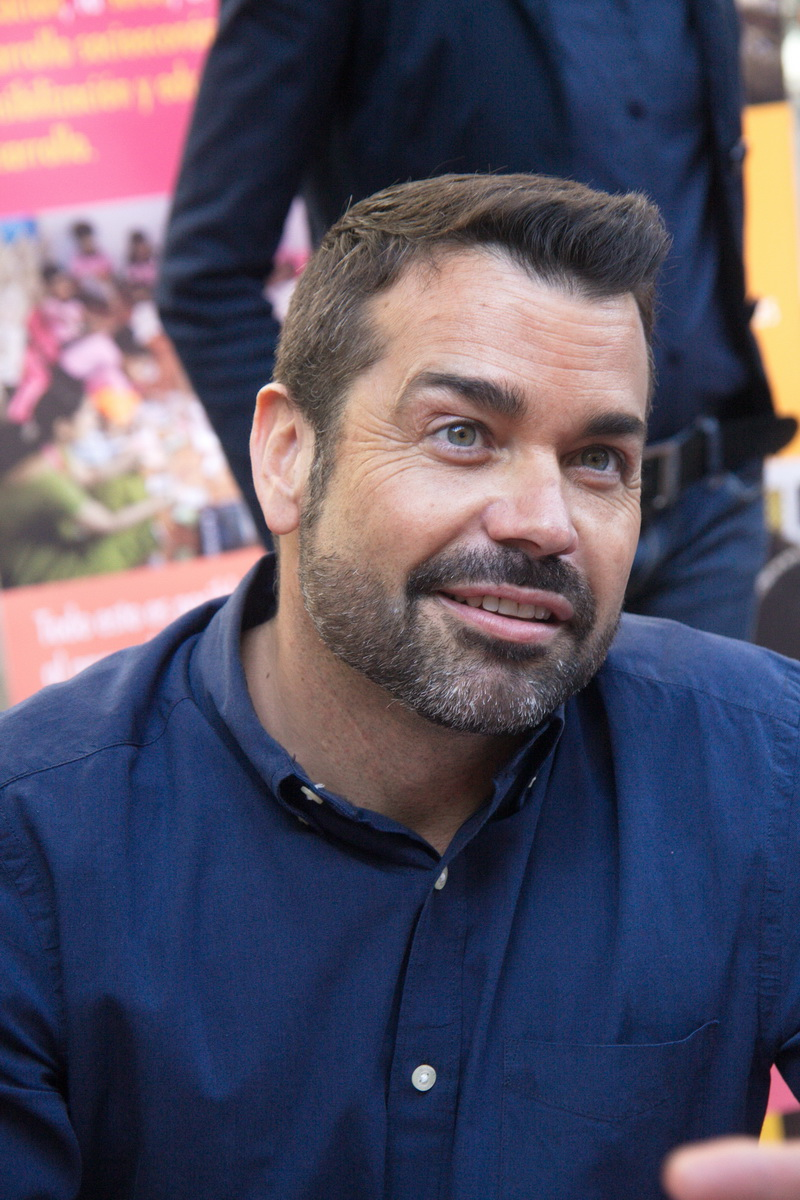
- At a book-signing in Barcelona in 2015
- Born: Jaume Sanllorente i Trepat; 1976 (age 49–50); Barcelona
- Education: Universitat Ramon Llull, Barcelona
- Occupations: journalist, writer
- Writing career
- Notable work: Sonrisas de Bombay
- Notable awards: Officer of the Orden del Mérito Civil
- Website: jaumesanllorente.com

Jaume Sanllorente (born 1976 in Barcelona) is a writer, journalist and activist for Human Rights. He is founder and General Director of the Fundación Sonrisas de Bombay and of the Mumbai Smiles Foundation, both of them non-governmental and non-profit organizations that focus their joint action on a peaceful struggle against poverty among the most underprivileged communities of Mumbai.

He graduated in Journalism in the Ramon Llull University. He studied Development Cooperation at the Institute for Peace and Cooperation Studies at the University of Oviedo and later at the United Nations Institute for Studies in India. He was also selected by the prestigious Harvard Kennedy School to take its Strategic Management Course for world leaders of non-governmental organizations. He has taken the course for paramedical staff specialized in leprosy at the Fontilles Institute (Alicante) and several courses on human resources, leadership and marketing at institutions such as Mafoi Consulting or the S. P. Jain Institute of Technology and Research in Mumbai.

After finishing his studies, he moved to London, where he lived for a year. Later, back in Barcelona, he worked in different media, such as Barcelona TV or COM Ràdio. He was also the correspondent in Catalonia for the Comercio Exterior magazine (Foreign trade).

Later on, after a trip to India during which he came across an orphanage with serious economic problems, he directed his personal and professional life towards the international cooperation for development and the defense of Human Rights of the most vulnerable sectors of population of Mumbai.

In 2005 he founded Sonrisas de Bombay (Mumbai Smiles). He currently lives in this Indian city, and still is the main leader of the project: an NGO that has focused its action for fifteen years on the peaceful fight against poverty and in favor of Human Rights in the most depressed areas of Mumbai. The struggle against human trafficking and the support of children from homeless families represent the main framework of his projects, which have already benefited more than 10,000 people. Beyond the projects with the most disadvantaged communities, the Foundation promotes campaigns and actions to raise awareness and foster education for the development, and, at the same time, to publicize and denounce any rights violation and the exclusion that millions of people suffer in the city. Almost 3,000 members and collaborating partners support this project to fight poverty.

Sanllorente wrote “The Dacca Seamstress” (Espasa), “The Power of Smiles” (Conecta) and the novel " La Canción de la Concubina "(Espasa). He also participated together with other 10 writers in the children's story book “10 Stories, 10 smiles "(Beascoa).

His first book was "Mumbai Smiles, the journey that changed my destiny" (Platform), translated into eight languages with a foreword by Dominique Lapierre and currently in its twenty-fifth edition. He has released his latest novel with the same publisher: " The women of Bombay: The struggle of the bravest in India.", a tribute to the women of the community with which he works.

He is also a co-author of "Mumbai, beyond smiles" (Platform) and has collaborated with several essays.

His leadership methods and his career as an entrepreneur are studied in universities and business schools such as IESE, which in 2011 published the Study case "Mumbai Smiles", currently taught to international MBA students.

He has received, among others, the Axuda 2007 Award, the Tierno Galván Award for Human Values, the Young Solidarity Award from the Castilla y León Film Festival and the Gold Medal from the Spanish Association for European Development. He is the honorary godfather of the twenty-second promotion of the Mossos d'Esquadra and a world ambassador of the Mumbai Leprosy Project. He has also been recognized as a "Man of Peace" by the Seville Peace Culture School Association.The Spanish Government awarded him the Official Cross of the Order of Civil Merit in 2009.

In 2015, he, along with one other person, delivered a speech at the commemorative ceremony of the United Nations’ 70th anniversary before its Secretary-General, Ban Ki-moon.

During 2020 year, a new office was opened in Madrid to collaborate with the different volunteer groups throughout the Spanish territory, to help promote action against poverty and hunger as these worsened during the pandemic.

== Life ==
Sanllorente is Catalan. He was born in Barcelona in 1976. He studied journalism at the Universitat Ramon Llull of Barcelona, and later studied management, marketing and development studies. In 2005 he founded a charitable organisation, Sonrisas de Bombay ("Bombay smiles"), to provide help to the poorest and most disadvantaged people of Mumbai, India. He later wrote a book about it, Sonrisas de Bombay. El viaje que cambió mi destino. In 2011 he published his first novel, La canción de la concubina, a fictionalised account of sex-trafficking in the Philippines.

Sanllorente was made an Officer of the Orden del Mérito Civil for his "extraordinary contribution to the fight against poverty".
