= Jaume Sastre =

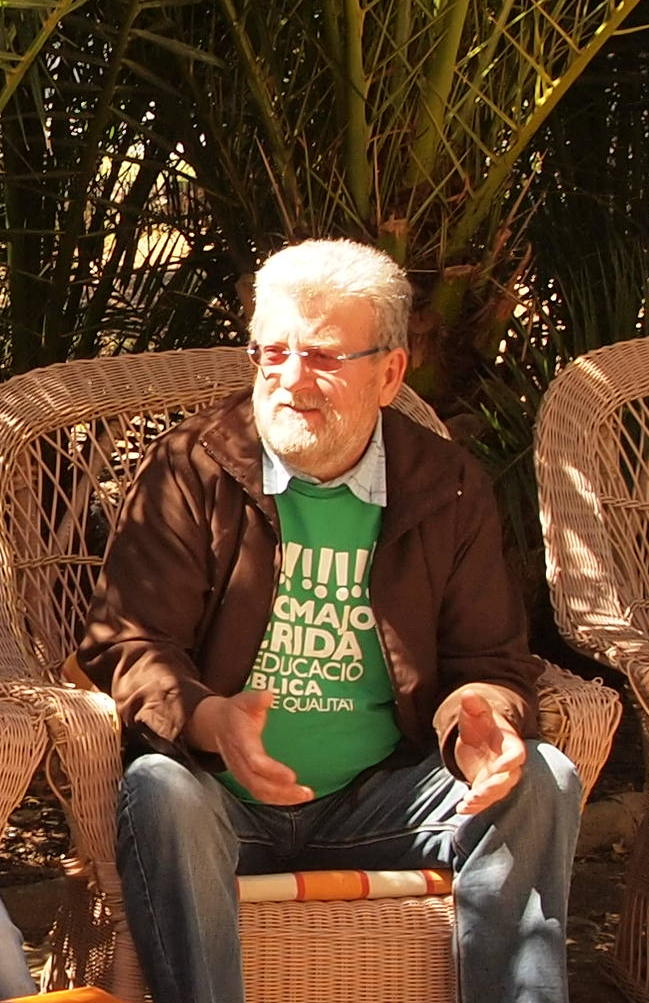
Jaume Sastre during his hunger strike at Sa Casa Llarga.

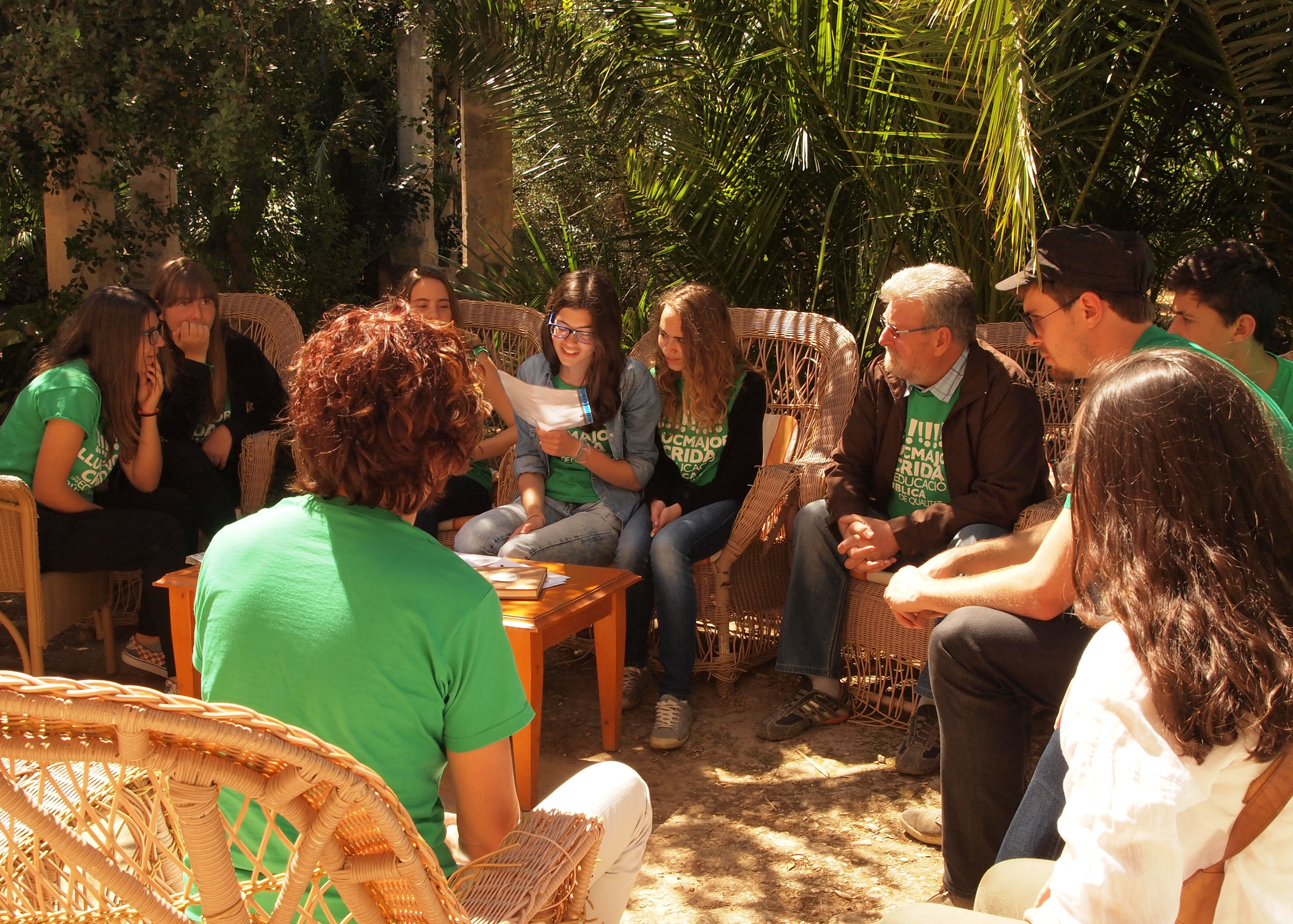
Jaume Sastre surrounded by his students at IES Llucmajor high-school during his hunger strike.

Jaume Sastre i Font (Sant Joan, Mallorca, 16 May 1959) is a Spanish literature and Catalan language teacher in Mallorca. He graduated in Catalan Philology at the Universitat de Barcelona in 1983. He published the poetry collections Insecticida (1977) and Simulacre (1980), belonged to the conceptual avantgarde group Taller Llunàtic from 1977 to 1988, and founded the Correu de son Coc magazine. In 1995, he formed together with other people the Lobby per la Independència group which carried out several popular actions to reivindicate the independence of the Catalan Countries. He was collaborator of the S'Arenal de Mallorca newsletter for many years. He was asked by the former President of the Balearic Islands, Gabriel Cañellas, to write his memories, which were officially presented in 2003 and became the most sold Catalan book of the year in the Balearic Islands.

He is one of the leaders of the Assemblea de Docents de les Illes Balears movement initiated in 2013 against the education law passed by the Balearic government which limited the use of Catalan language in the schools. On 8 May 2014, he began a hunger strike to force the Balearic government to re-open the negotiations on the law. He stopped his hunger-strike after 40 days, on June 16, 2014, when his health condition became "highly risky" according to medical reports.

== Work ==
- 1977: Insecticida (poetry)
- 1980: Simulacre (poetry)
- 1983: Freixura de porc o incitació a la intolerància (essay, self-edited)
- 1995: Mossegades (newspaper articles collection)
- 2003: Conversa amb Gabriel Cañellas: l'amo en Biel

As a co-author

- 1991: Un Puput de cresta molla: l'anticatalanisme a Mallorca: noms llinatges i fotografies
- 2007: Elogi de la transgressió: identitat nacional i desraó d'estat (annex, with Josep Palou)
- 2007: La guerra de la piscina (with Josep Palou)
