= Jaume Busquets =

Catalan architect (1903–1968)

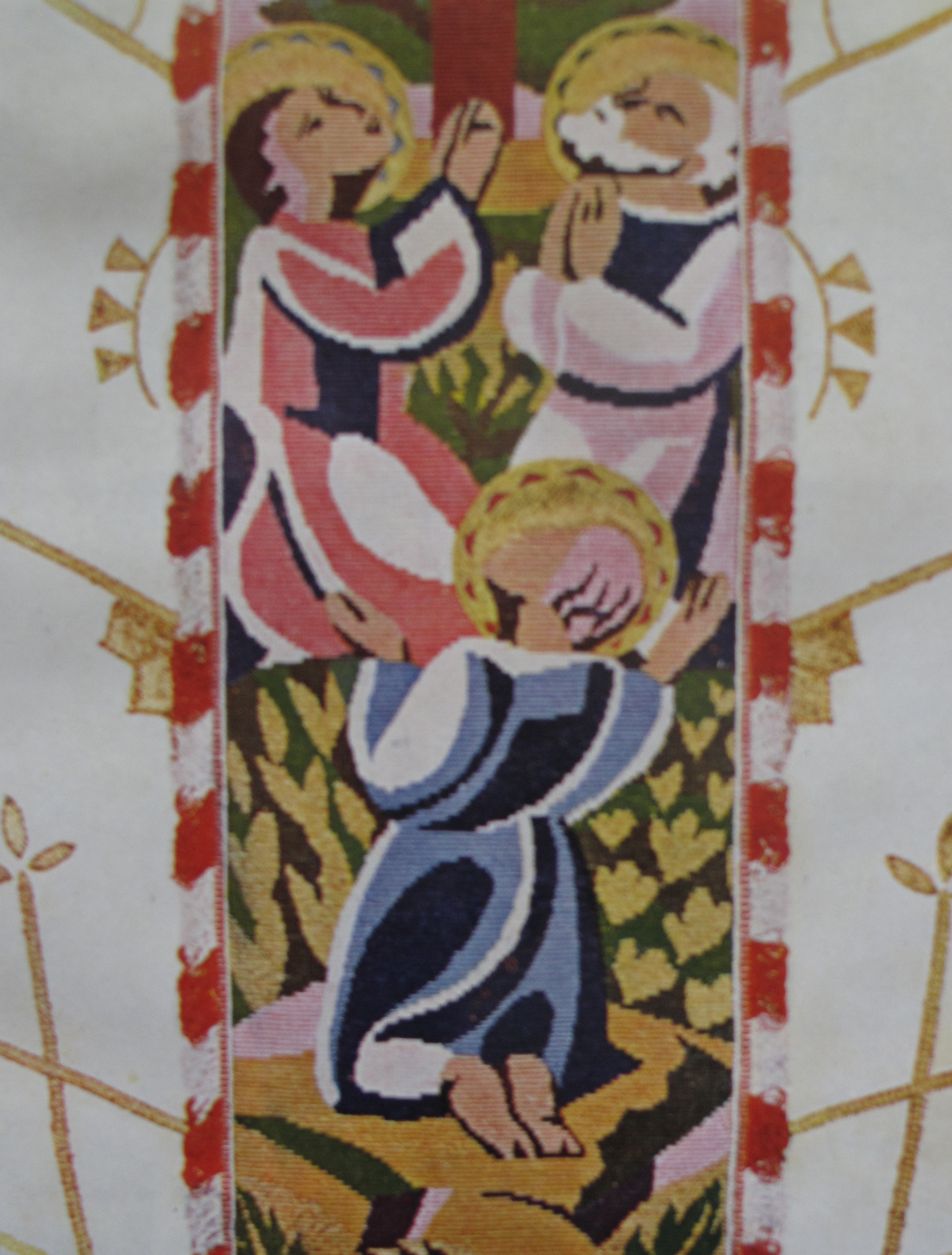

Jaume Busquets i Mollera (Girona, 1903 – Barcelona, 1968) was a Spanish sculptor and painter of the noucentisme generation from Catalonia.

He was the youngest son of a family of four artist brothers from Girona, Catalonia, Spain.

Busquets was a disciple of Antoni Gaudí. He designed and sculpted the Holy Family ensemble on the Nativity façade of Gaudí's Sagrada Familia Basilica Shrine in Barcelona. Busquets also designed and sculpted the statue of the Blessed Virgin with Child on the façade of the Girona Cathedral.

== Career ==
A precocious boy, Busquets went to work, at the age of fifteen, in the Barcelona studio of Darius Vilas.

In his final years, Busquets devoted his energies exclusively to sculpture, producing his masterworks, the Jesus, Maria i Josep ensemble (1958) that forms the centerpiece of Gaudi's Nativity Façade and the Mare de Deu statue (1962) that adorns the façade of the Girona Cathedral.

== Sources ==
- Ajuntament de Girona, Els Germans Busquets 1917-1941, Girona, 1996.
- Ajuntament de Girona, biographical page (Catalan)
- Busquets, Joan, L'art que expressa la fe, Girona, 1997.
- Cathedral de Girona Official website (English avail.)
