= Jaume Durán =

Spanish footballer

Personal information
- Full name: Jaume Durán Nierga
- Date of birth: 26 March 1984 (age 42)
- Place of birth: Banyoles, Spain
- Height: 1.83 m (6 ft 0 in)
- Position: Winger

Team information
- Current team: Girona C

Youth career
- Banyoles
- Vilobí

Senior career*
| Years | Team | Apps | (Gls) |
| 2003–2006 | FE Figueres | ? | (11) |
| 2005–2007 | Figueres | 7 | (0) |
| 2007 | → Peralada (loan) | ? | (?) |
| 2007–2008 | Palamós | 23 | (7) |
| 2008–2009 | Girona | 11 | (1) |
| 2009–2013 | Palamós | 62 | (3) |
| 2013–2016 | Peralada | 82 | (12) |
| 2016–2017 | Palamós | 35 | (6) |
| 2017– | Girona C | 50 | (2) |
- * Club domestic league appearances and goals as of 3 April 2019

Jaume Durán Nierga (born 26 May 1984) is a Spanish footballer who plays for Palamós CF as a left winger.

== Club career ==
Born in Banyoles, Girona, Catalonia, Durán represented CD Banyoles and Vilobí CF as a youth, and made his senior debut with Tercera División club FE Figueres in 2003. He first arrived in Segunda División B in 2005, after joining neighbouring UE Figueres.

On 31 January 2007, after being rarely used, Durán was loaned to CF Peralada in the fourth level, until June. In July, he moved to fellow league team Palamós CF, scoring a career-best seven goals during the campaign.

On 21 August 2008, Durán moved straight to Segunda División and signed for Girona CF. He made his professional debut nine days later, starting and scoring the game's only in an away success over Celta de Vigo.

Durán was released by the Blanquivermells on 22 June 2009, and returned to his former club Palamós on 10 July. He was regularly used during his four-year spell, and moved to Peralada on 13 August 2013.

On 15 June 2016 Durán returned to Palamós, still in the fourth tier.
