= Jaume Llambi =

Spanish wheelchair basketball player

Jaume Llambi Riera
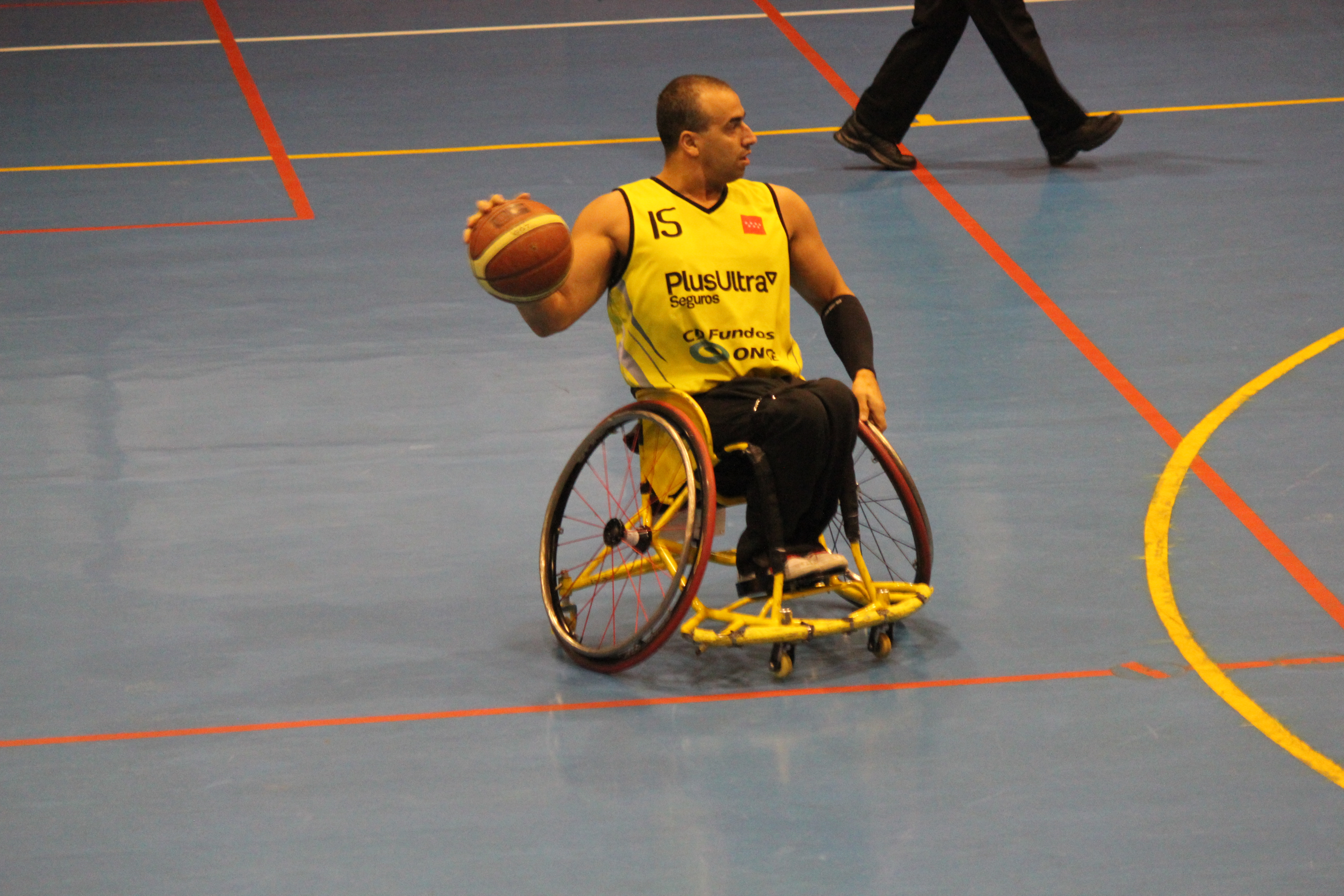
- Llambi in a 2013 game for ONCE against Getafe

Personal information
- Nationality: Spanish
- Born: 25 February 1974 (age 52)

Sport
- Country: Spain
- Sport: Wheelchair basketball

Jaume Llambi Riera (born 25 February 1974) is a wheelchair basketball player and table tennis player from Spain. A paraplegic as a result of a car accident when he was 8 years old, he went on to represent Spain at the 1992 Summer Paralympics in table tennis. He then switched sports to wheelchair basketball, making his national team debut in 1998. In 2012, he represented Spain in wheelchair basketball at the Paralympic Games in London where his team finished fifth.

== Personal ==
Llambi was born on 25 February 1974 in Barcelona. He was hit by a car when he was 8 years old. The accident left him a paraplegic. He started participating in disability sport as a way to assist with rehabilitation. One of the first sports he participated in was swimming, with a Barcelona-based swimming club.

Llambi now lives in Madrid.

In August 2012, Llambi attended a conference organised by Groupama Seguro in Madrid. The group was one of the main sponsors for the Spanish Paralympic Committee in the lead up to the 2012 Summer Paralympics. Alongside several other Paralympians, he presented on athlete preparations for the Games.

== Table tennis ==
Llambi competed at the 1992 Summer Paralympics in table tennis as an 18-year-old.

== Wheelchair basketball ==
Llambi is a guard, and a 1.5 point player. He was a recipient of a 2012 Plan ADO scholarship.

=== National team ===
Llambi represented Spain as a member of Spain men's national wheelchair basketball team for the first time when he competed in the 1998 IWBF World Championships in Sydney, Australia.

In 2011 in Nazareth, Poland, Llambi competed in the IWBF European Championships, where his team finished third. He competed in wheelchair basketball at the 2012 Summer Paralympics in London. It was the first time the Spain national team had qualified for the Paralympics in 16 years. The team, coached by Oscar Trigo, finished fifth. He was one of seven members of the 142 strong Spanish team that had also competed at the 1992 Games. With the national team, he won a bronze medal at the 2013 European Championships after defeating Sweden. In November 2013, he was awarded a €4,000 scholarship from the Madrid Olympic Foundation to support his efforts to qualify for the 2016 Summer Paralympics.

=== Club ===
As of 2013, Llambi has played club basketball for Fundosa CD ONCE since around 1997, when he was 23 years old.
